This is a list of legendary monarchs of Ethiopia, based on a king list provided by Ethiopian prince regent Tafari Makonnen (later known as Emperor Haile Selassie), with reference to multiple Ethiopian traditions and legends. Other Ethiopian king lists are discussed in the Other King Lists section.

Over Ethiopia's long history, multiple kingdoms and states have ruled, with one of the earliest known being Dʿmt from the 10th century BC. The last royal dynasty of Ethiopia was the Solomonic dynasty, who ruled until 1975 when the monarchy was abolished. Numerous king lists are in existence which chronicle the lineage of kings before the Solomonic dynasty, but often with noticeable disagreements between them. An official chronicle of the kings of Ethiopia from the royal family was published in Charles Fernand Rey's book In the Country of the Blue Nile in 1927, and is the longest Ethiopian king list published in the Western world. However, there is considerable debate on the historicity of this king list, in particular from archeologists such as E. A. Wallis Budge. Many of the claimed ancient monarchs of Ethiopia, such as Ethiopis, Angabo, Makeda, Menelik I and Abreha and Atsbeha are not archeologically attested as of yet, and information on them largely comes from oral traditions within Ethiopia or from texts written centuries after they are claimed to have lived.

Tradition

Ethiopian traditions record a range of different monarchs from earlier times whose existence has not been verified by modern-day archeology. Their stories and legends may have elements of truth but it is unclear to what extent this is the case. Numerous king lists have been recorded either on manuscripts or via oral tradition. However, surviving information on the kings prior to the reign of emperor Yekuno Amlak (1270–1285) is often scattered, incomplete or contradictory. The king lists that do refer to pre-1270 Ethiopia rarely match completely with one another. This variation is likely because the lists were compiled over a long time period across several different monasteries.

Notable legendary Ethiopian monarchs include:
Arwe – Mythical serpent king who ruled for 400 years before being killed by the father of the Queen of Sheba.
Ethiopis – A king who was said to have inspired the name of the country of Ethiopia.
Makeda – The biblical queen of Sheba who, according to Ethiopian tradition, is believed to be the mother of Menelik I.
Menelik I – Son of the queen of Sheba and king Solomon of Israel and founder of the Solomonic dynasty in the 10th century BC. Much information on this king comes from the 14th century text Kebra Nagast, however he remains historically unverified. In reality, the Solomonic dynasty began in 1270 AD with the reign of Yekuno Amlak.
Abreha and Atsbeha – Two brothers who supposedly brought Christianity to Ethiopia, however their existence is doubted by some historians. Some scholars believe that the story of Abreha and Atsbeha may in fact be based on the Axumite kings Ezana and Saizana.
Gudit – Legendary queen who supposedly laid waste to the Kingdom of Axum. Her deeds are recorded in oral tradition, but the various stories about her occasionally have differing or conflicting details.

This article will be mostly focusing on a 1922 king list written by the then Prince Regent of Ethiopia Tafari Makannon (the future emperor Haile Selassie) and published in 1927. It is the only known king list that attempts to provide a timeline of Ethiopian monarchs from the 46th century B.C. up to modern times without any gaps. There are however different versions that exist of this king list, and it is not clear when the first version was written. Ethiopian foreign minister Heruy Wolde Selassie is a contender for the author of the king list. His book Wazema contains a version of the list that begins later, in 2545 B.C., instead of 4530 B.C. like on Tafari's list. Aleka Taye Gabra Mariam also wrote a variation of this king list which has some slight differences in names and reign dates. These variations will be mentioned and discussed in this article.

The 1922 king list will be referred to as "Tafari's list" in this article in order to differentiate it from other versions. However, Tafari himself did not claim authorship and instead stated that he had made a copy of an already existing list.

It is also important to note that this king list contains a great deal of conflation between the history of modern-day Ethiopia and Aethiopia, a term used in ancient times and in some Biblical translations to refer to a generalised region south of Egypt, most commonly in reference to the Kingdom of Kush in modern-day Sudan. As a result, many parts of this article will deal with the history of ancient Sudan and how this became interwoven into the history of the Kingdom of Axum, Abyssinia (which includes modern-day Eritrea) and the modern-day state of Ethiopia.

Tafari Makonnen's King List

Background

Charles Fernand Rey's 1927 book In the Country of the Blue Nile included a 13-page appendix with a list of Ethiopian kings written by the Prince Regent Tafari Makonnen, who later became the emperor of Ethiopia in 1930. Tafari's list stretches back to 4530 BC and ends in 1779 AD, with dates following the Ethiopian Calendar. Tafari's cover letter was written in the town of Addis Ababa on the 11th day of Sane, 1914 (Ethiopian Calendar), which was 19 June 1922 on the Gregorian Calendar according to Rey. Rey himself was awarded Commander of the Order of the Star of Ethiopia by Tafari.

The goal of Tafari's list was to showcase the immense longevity of the Ethiopian monarchy. The list does this by providing precise dates over 6,300 years and drawing upon various historical traditions from both within Ethiopia and outside of Ethiopia (see "Historicity" section below).

The king list includes 312 monarchs divided into eight dynasties:
 Tribe of Aram (4530–3244 BC) (21 monarchs)
 Tribe of Kam (2713–1985 BC) (24 monarchs)
 Agdazyan dynasty (1985–982 BC) (52 monarchs)
 Dynasty of Menelik I (982 BC–493 AD) (132 monarchs)
 Dynasty of Kaleb (493–920) (27 monarchs)
 Zagwe dynasty (920–1253) (11 monarchs)
 Solomonic dynasty (1253–1555) (26 monarchs) and its Gondarian branch (1555–1779) (18 monarchs)

In addition to the above, there is an "Israelitish" dynasty with 8 unnumbered kings from the time of Zagwe rule which did not ascend to the throne of Ethiopia.

The first three dynasties are likely legendary and take various elements from the Bible, as well as Egyptian, Nubian, Greek, Coptic and Arab sources. The monarchs of the Menelik and Kaleb dynasties appear on various other king lists, but these lists often contradict one another and many of the kings themselves have not been archeologically verified, though some of the later kings on Tafari's list are confirmed by Aksumite coinage.  Many of the historically verified rulers of the Agdazyan and Menelik dynasties did not rule over Ethiopia but rather over Egypt and/or Nubia. It is only from the dynasty of Kaleb onwards that the monarchs are certainly Ethiopian or Aksumite in origin. The Zagwe and Solomonic dynasties are both historically verified, though only the Solomonic line has a secure dating of 1270 to 1975, which somewhat contradicts Tafari's list.

The following table outlines the origins of the dynasties of the 1922 king list:

Because of the length of the Menelik dynasty, Tafari's king list breaks up the line of monarchs into three sub-sections, concerning the time periods 982 BC–9 AD (the monarchs who reigned before the birth of Jesus Christ), 9–306 AD (Pre-Christian monarchs who reigned after the birth of Christ) and 306–493 AD (Monarchs of this line who were Christian themselves). Tafari's list names the kings from Kaleb to Dil Na'od as a separate dynasty, however other Ethiopian king lists do not make the same distinction and the Solomonic dynasty even claimed descent from Menelik I through Dil Na'od.

Each monarch has their respective reign dates and number of years listed. Two columns of reign dates were used in the list. One column uses dates according to the Ethiopian calendar from 4530 BC to 1779 AD. The other column lists the "Year of the World", placing the creation of the world in 5500 BC. Other Ethiopian texts and documents have also placed a similar date for the creation of the world, such as a manuscript in which the year 7260 was equivalent to the Gregorian date 1768, placing the creation of the world at 5492 BC. Another manuscript in dated to the year 7276 A.M. and is equivalent to 1784 A.D., which would place the beginning of the world in 5492 B.C. as well. Considering that the Ethiopian calendar is roughly 7 or 8 years behind the Gregorian calendar, this would match very closely with the date given on Tafari's list of 5500 B.C. (Ethiopian calendar). E. A. Wallis Budge noted that the Abyssinians/Ethiopians believed that the world was created "at the autumnal equinox 5500 years before the birth of Christ" and had previously used this as their main dating system. The dating of 5500 BC as the creation of the world on this list is likely influenced by calculations from the Alexandrian and Byzantine eras which placed the world's creation in 5493 BC and 5509 BC respectively.

Response to the King List

Egyptologist E. A. Wallis Budge was dismissive of the claims of great antiquity made by the Abyssinians, whom he described as having a "passionate desire to be considered a very ancient nation", which has been aided by the "vivid imagination of their scribes" who borrowed traditions from the Semites (such as Yamanites, Himyarites and Hebrews) and modified them to "suit [their] aspirations". He noted the lack of pre-Christian king lists and believed that there was no 'kingdom' of Abyssinia/Ethiopia until the time of king Zoskales. Budge additionally stated that all extant manuscripts date to the 17th–19th centuries and believed that any king lists found in them originated from Arab and Coptic writers. Budge felt that Tafari's king list "proves" that "almost all kings of Abyssinia were of Asiatic origin" and descended from "Southern or Northern Semites" before the reign of Yekuno Amlak. However, native Ethiopian rule before Yekuno Amlak is evidenced by the kingdoms of D'mt and Aksum, as well as by the rule of the Zagwe dynasty.

Budge divided Abyssinian/Ethiopian history into the following sections:
5500–1000 B.C. (Mythical)
1000–Nativity of Jesus (Traditional)
Nativity–1268 A.D. (Semi-historical)
1268–present (Historical)

With the above groupings, it is clear that Budge does not consider any of the kings of Tafari's list who reigned from 4530 to 1013 B.C. (i.e. before the reign of Makeda) to be historically verifiable.

The Geographical Journal reviewed In the Country of the Blue Nile in 1928, and noted the king list, which contained "many more names [...] than in previously published lists" and was "evidently a careful compilation" which helps to "clear up the tangled skein of Ethiopian history". However, the reviewer did also notice that it "[contained] discrepancies" which Rey "makes no attempt to clear up". The reviewer points to how king Dil Na'od is said to have reigned for 10 years from 910 to 920 A.D., yet James Bruce noted that the deposition of this dynasty occurred in 960 A.D., 40 years later. The reviewer does admit, however, that Henry Salt's dating of this event to 925 A.D. may have had "more reason" to it compared to Bruce's dating, considering that Salt's dating is seemingly backed up by Tafari's king list.

Historian Manfred Kropp described the king list as an artfully woven document developed as a rational and scientific attempt by an educated Ethiopian from the early 20th century to reconcile historical knowledge of Ethiopia. Kropp noted that king list has often been viewed by historians as little more than an example of a vague notion of historical tradition in north-east Africa. However he did also note that the working methods and sources used by the author of the king list remain unclear. Kropp further stated that despite some rulers' names having astonishing similarities to those of Egyptian and Meroitic rulers, there has been little attempt to critically examine the king list in relation to other Ethiopian sources.

Kropp further noted that Tafari's king list was the first Ethiopian king that attempted to provide the names of kings from the 970th year of the world's creation onwards without any chronological gaps. In particular, it was the first Ethiopian king list to consistently fill in all dates from the time of Solomon to the Zagwe dynasty. Kropp felt that the king list was a result of incorporating non-native traditions of Ethiopia into the native Ethiopian history.

Historicity and Sources

The king list includes a mixture of legendary and historically verifiable rulers. The earliest monarchs are likely legendary, particularly one king named Hogeb who is listed as having a 100-year reign. Some rulers are of ancient Egyptian, ancient Nubian, ancient Greek, Biblical, Coptic and Arab origin. Many kings from the reigns of Makeda and Menelik I onwards appear to be verified through their appearances on other existing king lists from Ethiopia itself. However, these king lists are not always supported by archeological evidence. Aksumite kings from approximately the third century onwards minted coins, a practice that may have begun either with the reign of Endubis or a short time before and continued until the 7th century. These coins help to prove the historicity of some kings on Tafari's list, but there are also many kings named on these coins who do not appear on Tafari's list. Likewise, there are numerous kings on Tafari's list who allegedly reigned during the Aksumite period that are otherwise unattested in the archeological record beyond the king lists that were written centuries after the fall of the kingdom of Aksum. While there are undoubtedly traces of historical fact on Tafari's king list, it is only from the Zagwe dynasty onwards that the names and order of the kings match the opinion of historians and archeologists who study Ethiopia. Although even the Zagwe dynasty has differing traditions on the kings (see Alternate Zagwe dynasty lists).

Heruy Wolde Selassie and Wazema

Historian Manfred Kropp believed the author of the king list was Ethiopian foreign minister Heruy Wolde Selassie (1878–1938). Selassie was later foreign minister to Haile Selassie and was a philosopher and historian, as well as being able to master several European languages. He had previously served as secretary to Menelik II. Kropp noted that Selassie's historical sources include the Bible, Christian Arab writers Jirjis al-Makin Ibn al-'Amid and Ibn al-Rāhib, and Christian traveler and writer Sextus Julius Africanus. Kropp argued that Selassie was one of a number of Ethiopian writers who sought to synchronize Ethiopian history with the wider Christian-Oriental histories. This was aided by the translation of Arabic texts in the 17th century. Kropp also felt that the developing field of Egyptology influenced Selassie's writings, particularly from Eduard Meyer, Gaston Maspero and Alexandre Moret, whose works were published in French in Addis Ababa in the early 20th century. Manfred Kropp additionally noted the existence of multiple versions of the king list, which suggest that Selassie grew increasingly critical of the sources he used for the first version of the list in 1922. Kropp believed that Selassie was also assisted by French missionaries and the works they held in their libraries.

Selassie wrote a book called Wazema which contained a variation of the king list. Kropp stated that there were three different versions of the king list published in the works of Heruy Wolde Selassie. Selassie's king list omits the first dynasty of Tafari's list – the so-called "Tribe of Ori or Aram" – and also the first three rulers of the second dynasty, instead beginning in 2545 B.C. with king Sebtah. Selassie stated that he used European literature amongst his sources, including James Bruce's Travels to Discover the Source of the Nile.

Manfred Kropp noted one important source for the information in Wazema. Selassie himself told the reader that if they wish to find out about more about Joktan, the supposed founder of the Agazyan dynasty, they could consult page 237 of a book by "Moraya". At first Kropp thought this was referring to Alexandre Moret, but it was later made clear that Selassie's king list had been inspired by a book called Histoire de l'Éthiopie (Nubie et Abyssinie) by Louis J. Morié, published in 1904.

Louis J. Morié's Histoire de l'Éthiopie
Louis J. Morié was a French historian who wrote a history of Ethiopia in the early 20th century. The book, titled Histoire de l'Éthiopie (Nubie et Abyssinie), was published in 1904 and was the first volume of a series on the history of Africa. Historian Manfred Kropp identified this book as a key source in the creation of the Ethiopian king list that was copied by Tafari Makannon in 1922 and published in Charles F. Rey's book In the Country of the Blue Nile in 1927. Kropp provided examples from Morie's text, specifically page 237 which provides information on Piori I (no. 46 on the king list) and pages 304–305 which provide information on the High Priests of Amun that appear on the Ethiopian king list, including the additional "Pinedjem" whose existence was an error of early Egyptology. Kropp described the discovery of the king list's source as exciting but mixed with some "bitterness" as Morié's book is more imaginative than scientific in its approach to Ethiopian history. Kropp blamed Selassie's European friends and contemporaries for the influence of Morié's book on Selassie's writing of Ethiopian history. Peter Truhart's Regents of Nations includes a list of Ethiopian kings resembling the 1922 list with additional information resembling that found in Morié's book, suggesting that Truhart was aware of this being the source of a large part of the king list. E. A. Wallis Budge mentions Morié's book in his own similarly titled work A History of Ethiopia: Nubia and Abyssinia, but surprisingly makes no mention of the clear similarity between Morié's narrative and the 1922 Ethiopian king list.

Louis J. Morié believed that it was during the reign of an Egyptian pharaoh, either Pepi I or Pepi II, that a colony of Sabaeans came to Aethiopia. This may have been the inspiration behind the narrative of the Ag'azyan dynasty on the 1922 king list, in which a Sabaean dynasty arrived in Ethiopia and became its rulers. Morié's book is also possibly the inspiration behind the inclusion of the "Tribe of Ori or Aram" on the 1922 king list, which was very similar to the legendary "Soleyman" dynasty from Coptic and Arabic folklore of Egypt. While Selassie's original king list did not include this dynasty, Morié's book may have nonetheless been retained and used by another Ethiopian writer who expanded the king list.

Morié's book displays his desire to hold on to religion and Biblical narratives in a world that was increasingly looking towards science. He showed concern with the possibility of abandoning religion, which would result in the "civilized" peoples of the world to descend down the moral scale. Morié felt that it was possible for science and religion to be in agreement. He described Atheism as one of the greatest scourges of nations and a cause of moral and political decadence. Because of his anxieties of the decline of religion, Morié sought to base his historical narrative around the Biblical timeline. One result of this is that his dating of Egyptian history is vastly different to what is commonly accepted in mainstream Egyptology today, such as his dating of the reign of Narmer/Menes to 5004 B.C. compared to modern day estimate of c. 3150 to 3000 B.C. Morié also described the Book of Genesis as the best source to consult on the most remote parts of human history.

Morié believed that the "Ethiopian state of Meroe" was the oldest empire of the post-Flood world, having been founded by Cush of the Bible, and went on to birth the kingdoms of Egypt, Uruk, Babylon, Assyria and Abyssinia. Morié followed the Biblical tradition by crediting Nimrod, a son of Cush, with founding Uruk and Babylon, and crediting Mizraim, a son of Ham, with founding Egypt. He additionally identified Mizraim with the Egyptian god Osiris, Ham with Amun and Cush with Khonsu. Morié defined the history of "Ethiopia" as divided into two parts; Ancient Nubia and Christian Abyssinia, and defined "Ethiopians" as the Nubian and Abyssinian peoples.

The following collapsible table includes a list of possible sources for the names and information on the 1922 Ethiopian king list:
{| class="wikitable mw-collapsible mw-collapsed" style="font-size:85%
|-
! width="20%"| Monarch
! Reference
! width="10%"| Ref.
|-
|Ori or Aram (no. 1)
|rowspan=19|The so-called "Soleyman" dynasty from Coptic and Arabic folklore that ruled over Egypt in the Antediluvian era. The order is the same as recorded on the 1922 Ethiopian king list. The majority of the names also match, though some were altered for the Ethiopian king list ("Zeyn al-Zaman" to "Zeenabzamin", "Riyan" to "Elaryan", "Dalukah" to "Eylouka", "Sahalok" to "Saloug", "Scharid" to "Kharid" and "Malinos" to "Milanos"). The name used for the first ruler on the 1922 king list, "Ori", likely stems from Morié's claim that this dynasty was called the "Aurites", and that Aram had inspired the name of his country, "Aurie" or "Aeria".
|rowspan=19|
|-
|Gariak I (no. 2)
|-
|Gannkam (no. 3)
|-
|Borsa (no. 4)
|-
|Gariak II (no. 5)
|-
|Djan I (no. 6)
|-
|Djan II (no. 7)
|-
|Zeenabzamin (no. 9)
|-
|Sahlan (no. 10)
|-
|Elaryan (no. 11)
|-
|Nimroud (no. 12)
|-
|Eylouka (no. 13)
|-
|Saloug (no. 14)
|-
|Kharid (no. 15)
|-
|Hogeb (no. 16)
|-
|Makaws (no. 17)
|-
|Affar (no. 19)
|-
|Milanos (no. 20)
|-
|Soliman Tehagui (no. 21)
|-
|Kam (no. 22)
|Morié refers to Ham as "Kham" and dates his reign to 5880–5802 B.C. (78 years), the same length of time that Kam has on the 1922 Ethiopian king list, though with much later dates used.
|
|-
|Habassi (no. 24)
|Morié names a king called "Habesch" who was the father of the Abyssinians. He later claimed that Habesch was a son of Cush who ruled in Axum while the other sons of Cush ruled different regions.
|
|-
|Nehasset Nais (no. 29)
|Morié mentioned a story of a Nubian courtesan named "Nahaset Nais" ("Nahaset the black") who drowned all her lovers in the Red Sea until she suffered the same fate at the hands of the Egyptian king "Hor-ka-am" (Horus), who is placed directly after Nehasset Nais on the 1922 Ethiopian king list.
|
|-
|Horkam (no. 30)
|An alternate name for the Egyptian god Horus used by Morié. He is identified by Morié with Raamah, a son of Cush. Morié also claims that Horkam/Raamah ruled over a coastal region of Ethiopia.
|
|-
|Saba I (no. 31)
|Morié named Seba, son of Cush, as "Sheba I".
|
|-
|Manturay (no. 38)
|Morié named "Mentou-Rai" as a Meroitic king and identified him with the Iranian god Mithra or Mithras. Morié equated Mithras with the Egyptian god Mentu (or "Mentou-Ra")
|
|-
|Rakhu (no. 39)
|Morié named "Ra-khou" as a Meroitic king who succeeded "Mentou-Rai" and identified him with Phlegyas.
|
|-
|Sabe I (no. 40)
|Morié named this king as the successor to Manturay and Rakhu and identified him with Cepheus.
|
|-
|Sousel Atozanis (no. 42)
|Morié used the name "Attozanes" as one of a number of alternate names for the Kushite king Aktisanes.
|
|-
|Ramenpahte (no. 44)
|Morié claimed that this was the name of an Ethiopian nobleman who was supposed to marry "Béroua" (or Meroe), a daughter of "Ba-en-Khons"/Cambyses, but she was taken by the king to be his own wife.
|
|-
|Piori I (no. 46)
|Morié named "Poeri I" as a ruler of Ethiopia at some point between 3817 and 1800 B.C., who reigned during a time when Rama (a Hindu god that Morié claimed was originally Maharaja of Magadha and Ayodhya) was able to conquer the whole of India, Ceylon and Arabia before arriving in Egypt and fought against the Pharaoh, who was killed in the fighting. The Pharaoh's successor then became a tributary to Rama and the king of Ethiopia, "Poeri", followed his example without engaging in battle with Rama. The empire of Rama did not survive its founder.Morié claimed that a second invasion, that of the Hyksos, led to the king of Aethiopia having to recognize their suzerainty in 2000 B.C. and this lasted throughout the duration of Hyksos rule and was directly followed by rule over Aethiopia by the Egyptian Eighteenth dynasty. Morié claimed that that Abyssinians called the Hyksos "Agaazi", a name which supposedly inspired the name of the Ge'ez language. However, Morié later claimed that some Hyksos had remained in Aethiopia and were ancestors of the Tigrayian people in modern-day Ethiopia. While the king of Ethiopia at this time is not named, the decision to date the beginning of Hyksos rule to 2000 B.C. may have inspired the author of the 1922 Ethiopian king list to use this date as the start of Piori I's reign.
|
|-
|Akbunas Saba II (no. 47)
|Morié named Sheba, son of Raamah, as "Sheba II" and specifically notes that he ruled a part of Ethiopia. Morié also claimed that Sheba II built the city of "Sheba" in Ethiopia, named after himself, and also built "Hasabo" (the "City of the South") which later became Meroe. This narrative may be partially based on Josephus's text Antiquities of the Jews, in which he described Sheba as a walled city in Aethiopia that was renamed Meroe by Cambyses II.The name "Akbunas" may be based on "Ba-en-Khons" ("Soul of Khons"), a named used by Morié for a king of Aethiopia called Cambyses. Morié claimed that Cambyses/Ba-en-Khons chose one of his youngest daughters as his wife, in a similar fashion to pharaoh Ramesses II. This woman was named "Béroua" (or Meroe) and after her death, Cambyses/Ba-en-Khons renamed Saba, the capital of Aethiopia, to Meroe in her honour. This narrative was likely also inspired by Josephus's writings on Meroe and Cambyses II. Despite the obvious similarity with the name of the famous Achaemenid emperor Cambyses II, Morié insisted that the name of Cambyses/Ba-en-Khons should not be confused with the Persian conqueror with this name. He believed that Cambyses/"Be-en-Khons" had been the inspiration behind the name of the Kambaata people of modern-day Ethiopia. Morié additionially claimed that "Ba-en-Khons"/Cambyses had two other wives, one named "Doud-ew-ra" ("Daughter of Greatness") and the other being a daughter of "Har-hat", and also had 14 children, 9 sons and 5 daughters.Another potential source for the name "Akbunas" is "Ankhnas", a supposedly "little-known" ruler of Aethiopia named by Morié who believed the name to be translated into Greek as Oceanus. King "Akhnas" reigned for 29 years (1914–1885 B.C.) and was directly succeeded by "Nekhti I", who may be identified with Nakehte Kalnis, the next king on the Ethiopian king list after Akbunas Saba. "Akhnas" was considered by Morié to be the first of the Hyksos or the "Pasteurs" dynasty who reigned after Aethiopias conquest by Rama. This dynasty also included "Nekhti I", "Sebi II", "Nekhti II" and "Atew I", the next four kings in Morié's narrative.While Morié considered "Sheba II" and "Ba-en-Khons" to be two separate individuals, the 1922 king list combines them into one king.
|
|-
|Nakehte Kalnis (no. 48)
|Morié names a king of Ethiopia called "Nyktée, of the Nekhti". He could be referring to Nycteus, a king of Thebes in Greece, although the name "Thebes" was also used to refer to a place in Upper Egypt.Morié later mentions a king named "Nekhti I" who directly succeeds "Ankhnas" and reigned for 55 years (1885–1830 B.C.), mirroring the succession of Akbunas Saba II by Nakehte Kalnis on the 1922 Ethiopian king list. The reign length of 55 years seems to have been used for king Aknas/Akbunas Saba II on the 1922 king list instead. Morié appears to identify "Nekhti I" as the husband of Amalthea, though does not give an explanation why.
|
|-
|Kasiyope (no. 49)
|Cassiopeia or "Kassiopée" is named as a monarch of Ethiopia and is, for unclear reasons, identified with the priest Khonsuemheb from the ancient Egyptian ghost story "Khonsuemheb and the Ghost". Morié also uses the name "Kassiopée I" to refer to an otherwise unnamed queen of Ethiopia who plotted with Set the assassination of Osiris according to one version of the Osiris myth as recounted by Plutarch.Morié appears to mention this queen a second time as the wife of "Sebi III", whom he also identifies with Cepheus. The second "Kassiopée" is also known as "Kassiépée" or "Anna-Melekît", allegedly a daughter of "Cynthia". The name "Cynthia" was used for various mythological figures, namely Artemis, Selene and Diana. Of these women, only Selene is known to have had daughters, though she has never been associated with Cassiopeia. Morié identified the "Kassiopée II" with the Syrian and Mesopotamian goddess Anammelech. He clarified that "Kassiopée II" should not be confused with the following women:
 "Kassiopée the Nereid" (Morié may have confused some elements of the traditional story of Cassiopeia, as there are no known Nereids named "Cassiopeia" but instead she herself claimed to be more beautiful than them)
 Memphis, wife of Epaphus, who was sometimes called "Cassiopeia".
 Cassiopeia, wife of Phoenix, daughter of Arabius and mother of Atymnius.
| 
|-
|Sabe II (no. 50)
|Morié named king "Sebi II (Képhée)", who reigned for 15 years (1830–1815 B.C.), as the successor of "Nekhti I" and husband of "Kassiopée the Elder". This is mirrored on the 1922 Ethiopian king list which names "Sabe II" as the direct successor of "Kasiyope", who succeeded "Nakehte Kalnis". The 15-year reign length of "Sebi II" is replicated on the 1922 king list for "Sabe II". While the name "Képhée" and the identification of this king's wife as "Kassiopée" suggests that this king should be identified with the mythical figure Cepheus, Morié appears to reserve this identification for "Sebi III", who confusingly has the same name and a wife also called "Kassiopée".Morié lists an alternate name for this king, "Sebi-Meiamoun", and stated that some people believed he was deified as the Semitic god Adrammelech. Aleka Taye called this king "Sabe II Ayibe" on his king list, possibly inspired by the name "Adrammelech" being associated with Sabe II.
|
|-
|Etiyopus I (no. 51)
|Morié called this king "Atew I (Ethiops)" and named him as a son of the Roman god Vulcan, following the narrative written by Pliny the Elder. Morié claimed this king ruled Aethiopia for 60 years (1760–1700 B.C.), similar to the 56-year figure used on the 1922 Ethiopian king list. Morié also claimed that a king called "Nekhti II" reigned for 55 years between "Sebi II" and "Atew I", but this king was omitted from the 1922 king list.
|
|-
|Lakndun Nowarari (no. 52)
|Morié claimed that a king of Aethiopia called "Nower-Ari" was the father of Ahmose-Nefertari, wife of the Egyptian pharaoh Ahmose I. Morié additionally claimed that "Nower-Ari"'s wife was called "Ahhotep", similar to Ahmose's mother Ahhotep I, though Morié clarified that she should not be confused with Ahmose's mother. However, Ahmose-Nefertari's father was in fact the Egyptian pharaoh Seqenenre Tao.Morié dated this king's reign to 1700–1670 B.C., which lasted 30 years. The 1922 Ethiopian king list likewise gives this king a 30-year reign.
|
|-
|Tutimheb (no. 53)
|Morié claimed that "Nower-Ari"'s successor was called "Thout-em-heb" and was defeated by Moses, who was the head of the army of pharaoh Amenemhat I. Morié also dated this king's reign to 1670–1650 B.C. (20 years). This 20-year reign length was also used in the 1922 Ethiopian king list, although the actual dates were one century earlier than Morié's dates.
|
|-
|Her Hator I (no. 54)
|Morié claimed that pharaoh Amenhotep I replaced "Thout-em-heb" with one of his astrologers named "At-Hor" (identified with Jethro, father of Zipporah and father-in-law of Moses), son of "Ra-oëri" (or "Raguel"). King "At-Hor" reigned for 25 years (1650–1625 B.C.) according to Morié and was succeeded by his son "Kheb-ab" (Hobab), who is omitted from the 1922 Ethiopian king list. "At-Hor" was the first of the "Jethrides" dynasty in Morié's narrative. This dynasty also included "Kheb-ab", "Atew II" and "Nekthi III" (who was excluded from the 1922 Ethiopian king list), the next three kings of Morié's narrative.In an earlier part of his book, Morié names Hephaestus as father of "Aethiops" (Etiyopus II is the 55th king of the 1922 Ethiopian king list). It appears that this piece of information was combined with the later section on king "At-Hor" to provide the placement of king "Her Hator I" on the 1922 king list. Aleka Taye called this king "Yotor" on his version of the king list, likely based on the name "At-Hor".
|
|-
|Etiyopus II (no. 55)
|Morié named a king called "Atew II (Ethiops)" who reigned for 2 years (1572–1570 B.C.), supposedly during the time of Thutmose III and Amenhotep II, although modern Egyptology would not consider these dates accurate for these pharaohs. According to Morié, "Atew II"'s daughter married "Danaos", nomarch of Tanis, possibly the same person as the mythical figure Danaus. Morié additionally claimed this king was succeeded by "Nekhti III" (r. 1570–1515 B.C.), although he is omitted from the 1922 Ethiopian king list.
|
|-
|Senuka I (no. 56)
|Morié gave the name "Snouka I Menken" to the Kushite king Aktisanes and stated that he dethroned the last king of the Thirteenth dynasty and founded the Fourteenth dynasty. "Snouka I Menken" ruled Egypt for 13 years (from 2398 B.C. to 2385 B.C.) before being deposed and expelled by the second king of the Fourteenth dynasty, called "Hakori III" or "Akhoréos". This statement was clearly inspired by a narrative told by Diodorus. Morié's dating is also wildly out of sync with modern-day Egyptological dating of the reigns of these pharaohs.Later in his book, Morié mentiones another king called "Snouka II Menken" who ruled Aethiopia for 16 years (1515–1499 B.C.) and had "Aktisanès" and "Attozanès" as alternate names, like with the first king named "Snouka". According to Morié's narrative, "Snouka II Menken" was also the High Priest of Amun and had support from the Egyptian people, who were revolting against Akhenaten and the Atenist religion at the time. "Snouka II Menken" was able to defeat Akhenaten in 1512 B.C. and became ruler of Egypt until his death, afterwards allowing Egyptians to choose a native Egyptian as the next king. Modern Egyptology however dates Akhenaten's reign to much later, c. 1351–1334 B.C., unlike Morié's dating.The 1922 Ethiopian king list more closely follows the narrative of the second king named "Snouka", as his chronological placement comes after "Atew"/Etiyopus II and the 16-year reign length is similar to the 17-year reign length that appears on the 1922 list.Aleka Taye's version of the king list calls the 56th king "Senuka Menkon".
|
|-
|Bonu I (no. 57)
|For unclear reasons, Morié identified the Egyptian god Bennu (or "the Phoenix, Bennou") as a king of Ethiopia (i.e. Nubia). It is possible that the reason why Morie names Bennu as a king is because of his belief that the name of the ancient Egyptian city of Hebenu meant "home of the phoenix".Morié names "Bennou I" as the successor to "Snouka II Menken", reigning for 8 years (1449–1491 B.C.). Both the line of succession and the reign length match with what is written on the later 1922 Ethiopian king list.
|
|-
|Mumazes (no. 58)
|Morié claimed that "Bennou I" was succeeded by his daughter "Moumésès (Moso)", who reigned for 4 years and was said to ride a chariot dragged by bulls. Her name supposedly meant "Child of water, of the Nile". The line of succession and reign-length are both replicated on the 1922 Ethiopian king list.This name was possibly inspired an alternate name used by Morié for Moses, "Moumësès (Moïse)". Morié claimed that, according to ancient Greek scholar Alexander Polyhistor, "Moso" had apprently been a female legislator to the Jews. Morié believed that there had been some confusion with accounts claiming that "Moso" was a legislator of the Jews, and other accounts claiming that Moses was a legislator for the Aethiopians. He believed that it was more likely that "Moso" referred to woman ruling over Aethiopia.
|
|-
|Aruas (no. 59)
|Morié claimed that Queen "Moumésès (Moso)" was succeeded by her son "Arouas", who reigned for 7 months. His name supposedly means "Precious Existence" and he allegedly has sometimes been confused with Aaron, elder brother of Moses. The 1922 Ethiopian king list replicated the name, order of succession and reign length, but changed the gender of "Arouas"/Aruas to female.
|
|-
|Amen Asro I (no. 60)
|Morié claimed that "Arouas" was directly succeeded by "Amenasro I", who reigned for 17 years (1487–1470). He supposedly briefly ruled Egypt as well for 2 years (1477–1475) before being driven out of Egypt by "Nowertai", a brother of pharaoh Ay.
|
|-
|Piori II (no. 62)
|rowspan=2|Morié mentioned a painting of pharaoh Seti I seated in a chapel while his son prince Ramesses brings with him the Aethiopian prince "Amen-em-hat" (no. 63 on the 1922 Ethiopian king list), son of king "Poeri". It is possible that Morié may be referring to the Viceroys of Kush named Paser I and Amenemopet, who were father and son and served as Viceroys during the reigns of the pharaohs from Ay to Seti I. If so, then Morié may have mistakenly believed them to be kings of Kush rather than Viceroys from Egypt. Morié believed that "Amen-em-hat I" attempted a revolt against Ramesses II.
|rowspan=2|
|-
|Amen Emhat I (no. 63)
|-
|Protawos (no. 67)
|Morié mentions Proteus as a king of Egypt from Greek mythology.
|
|-
|Konsi Hendawi (no. 69)
|Morié claimed that "Amen-em-hat I" was succeeded by king called "Khonsi (Gangès)" in 1370 BC and reigned for 5 years, a reign length that was replicated on the 1922 Ethiopian king list. According to Morié, this king was born in India and arrived in Aethiopia with a Hindu colony. Morié earlier claimed that in c. 1370 B.C., a Hindu colony settled in Aethiopia, and this was the reason why some ancient Greek writers mentioned Aethiopians of Indian origin. Morié described "Khonsi" as a "hero remarkable for his beauty and size". He also stated that "Khonsi" was the son of an incestuous union, "committed unwittingly", between king "Ganges", previously called "Khliaros", and his mother, the goddess Ganga. Additionally, "Khonsi" was apparently the brother of "Limnate" and "Princess Limniaké", the latter being the mother of "Atys the Indian" who was killed the wedding of Perseus, the legendary founder of Mycenae. Morié claimed that "Khonsi" had come to Aethiopia and ruled there after going into exile following the death of his father by suicide. Despite having a "glorious reign" in which he founded "60 cities" and "drained swamps", he was nonetheless put to death by his subjects.The name "Khonsi" is possibly connected with the Egyptian god Khonsu and "Gangès" is a clear reference to the Ganges river.
|
|-
|Bonu II (no. 70)
|According to Morié, "Khonsi" was succeeded by "Bennou II", who reigned for 2 years, from 1365 to 1363 B.C., a reign length that was replicated in the 1922 Ethiopian king list, though with reign dates set 110 years earlier. Morié clarified that this king should not be confused with the Egyptian god Bennu, despite the similarity in the name. "Bennou II" was the first of "the Bennides" dynasty, which also included "Sebi III", "Se-Khons" and "Snouka III Menken", the next three kings of Morié's narrative.

"Bennou II" was married to several women, including:
 Alphesiboea, mother of Adonis.
 Achiroe, mother of Cepheus (the next king on the 1922 king list). This woman is confusingly named twice, first as "Kléobula" and second as "Ankhinoé" and in both cases she is named as the mother of Cepheus and Phineas.
 Neaera, mother of Lycurgus of Arcadia.
 Auge, daughter of Aleus, king of Arcadia.
 Perimede, daughter of Oeneus (king of Calydon) and mother of Europa and Astypalaea.

Additionally, he fathered children whose mothers are not known:
 Labdacus, king of Thebes in Greece.
 Piras, king of Argos (although his mother is known to be Evadne).
 Phoenice, a Phoenician princess (although her mother is known to be Telephassa). She was the mother of Proteus with Poseidon/Neptune. Morié equates Neptune with pharaoh Merneptah and Proteus with Seti II, perhaps because different Proteus of Egypt is known in Greek writings.
 Cilix (although his mother is known to be Cassiopeia).
In total, he had 13 children.

These marriages would suggest that "Bennou II" is to be equated with several male mythological figures:
 Phoenix, son of Agenor.
 Belus, an Egyptian king from Greek mythology.
 Aleus, a king of Arcadia.
 Polydorus, king of Thebes.
 Argus, king of Argos.

Such identifications result in much confusion around "Bennou II". In particular, it is odd that Morié should claim this king was both Aleus and married to a daughter of Aleus, even though there is no tradition telling of an incestous marriage between them.

Morié claimed that "Bennou II"/"Phoenix" had settled in Aethiopia due to his sister Europa being kidnapped by the Cretans and Agenor forbidding his sons to return until she was found. "Bennou II"/"Phoenix" was considered unpopular because he was considered a usurper and abdicated in favour of his son Cepheus after two years of rule. He later returned to Sidon to became its second "Egyptian king" after the death of Agenor according to Morié. "Bennou II"/"Phoenix" was also a contemporary of Ramesses II according to Morié's dating.

Additionally, Morié stated that "Sebi (Képhéos)" succeeded him at Meroe as king of Aethiopia, while another son "Bennou (Phinée)" was a nomarch of a province and was heir to the throne until Persius sowed disunity between them.

According to Morié, Agenor was apparently a brother of Ramesses II.
|
|-
|Sebi III (Kefe) (no. 71)
|Morié names Cepheus or "Képhée, of the Sebi" as a ruler of Ethiopia. On first impression, Morié appears to identify both "Sabe II" and "Sebi III" with Cepheus and names the wife of both kings as Cassiopeia. However, it is more likely that he intended to identity "Sebi III" more directly with Cepheus, as he provides more information on this king that matches elements of the traditional story of Cepheus, Cassiopeia and Andromeda."Sebi III" was the son of the previous king and reigned for 15 years (1363–1348 B.C.), a reign length that is replicated on the 1922 Ethiopian king list, which pushes the dates back by over 100 years. Morié claimed that Cepheus/"Sebi III" was deified as the ancient Sicilican god Adranus.

"Sebi III" was married to two women:
 Cassiopeia or "Kassiopée" – also known as "Anna-Melekît" and a daughter of "Cynthia". She was one of the most beautiful women of her time. She had a daughter named Andromeda, otherwise known as "Lykomède" or "Deltoton".
 "Ioppé" – daughter of Aeolus and inspiration behind the name of Jaffa.

The traditional narrative of Cassiopeia in partially recounted by Morié in association with the wife of "Sebi III", though with some slight differences. He claims that a kind of beauty contest took place in Greece in which Cassiopeia (or possibly Andromeda) found no success due to her "tanned complexion" and this led to an open war. Cassiopeia insulted the queen of Crete and this led to the Greeks invading Aethiopia. In the ninth year of "Képhée"'s reign, a Greek fleet led by "Kétos" or "Karkharias" (who is normally a sea creature instead of a fleet commander in Greek mythology) attacked the coast of Aethiopia and seized the port of Jaffa, where Cepheus was residing, and forced the king to give his daughter Andromeda in marriage to him. The oracle of Amun advised to king to grant this request. Cepheus/"Képhée" agreed to this on the condition that the Greeks do not stop trade with Aethiopia. Andromeda was unhappy with this arrangement but was nonetheless taken to the ship of "Kétos". She was rescued by Perseus, who killed "Kétos" and returned her to her father. Perseus married Andromeda after killing "Bennou (Phinée)", a brother of "Sebi III", who the king had once promised his daughter's hand in marriage. One of the children of Perseus and Andromeda was "Képhène", named after "Képhée", who was the father of the Aethiopian king "Erythras III".

According to Morié, this king was a contemporary of Ramesses II. "Sebi III" was a powerful king who possessed Syene (modern-day Aswan in Egypt), and had the Nasamones of Libya and the Aethiopians of Gedrosia as his tributes.

"Sebi III" had 20 sons and 2 daughters. The sons include "Anhour-em-hat" (Andromada) and "Pehrer" or "Pehres", while the rest are little known. One of the daughters was named "Hathor-em-hat" (Andromeda).
|
|-
|Djagons (no. 72)
|According to Morié, the next king of Aethiopia after "Sebi III" was called "Se-Khons (Gigon)" ("Son of Khons") and he reigned for 21 years (1348–1327 B.C.). Aleka Taye's version of the 1922 Ethiopian king list calls the 72nd king "Jagonis Sekones". However, Tafari's version does not include the name "Sekones" or "Se-Khons" for Sebi III's successor. The 21-year reign length from Morié's account is slightly shorted to 20 years on Tafari's list.Morié stated that this king's reign coincided with the last years of Ramesses II. Morié claimed that it was during the reign of this king that Bacchus ravaged Aethiopia and "probably" killed the king. During the reign of "Se-Khons", an Egyptian prince named "Meneptah" (son of Sesostris) fled to Aethiopia and never left the country afterwards.
|
|-
|Senuka II (no. 73)
|According to Morié, king "Snouka III-Menken" ruled Aethiopia for 13 years (1327–1314 B.C.). He was secretly summoned by Egyptian nobles to declar war on pharaoh Amenmesse, who ruled Egypt with great cruelty. "Snouka III-Menken" defeated Amenmesse and ruled over Egypt for 3 years (1327–1324 B.C.), during which time he ruled both Egypt and Ethiopia with kindness, equity and righteousness. He had the noses of thieves cut off before the thieves themselves were sent to Rhinocorura, located on the Egypt-Syria border (This story is likely inspired by that of Actisanes, who, according to Diodorus Siculus, founded Rhinocorura and conquered Egypt in the reign of pharaoh "Amasis"). "Snouka III-Menken" was eventually driven out of Egypt in 1324 B.C. by "Meneptah II", who was devoted to his minister named "Bai" (this likely refers to Siptah and Chancellor Bay). "Snouka III-Menken" held a son of "Meneptah I", named "Seti", as prisoner in Aethiopia and sent him to Egypt to cause embarressment to the pharaoh, but an unexpected compromise is reached and "Meneptah II" acknowledges "Seti" as his eventual successor Seti II. Morié's interpretation of events is completely at odds with modern-day Egyptology, which places Seti II before Siptah and acknowledges Siptah as a son of either Seti II, Amenmesse or Merneptah.
|
|-
|Helena (no. 76)
|It is possible that the name of this queen came from "Hemera", an alternate name Morié uses for Eos, wife of Tithonus. Hemera is more commonly known as a personification of day in Greek mythology but is sometimes identified with Eos.
| 
|-
|Her Hator II (no. 78)
|Morié names a king called "Her Hator", who he identified with the ancient Greek mythical figure Erythras for unclear reasons. Morié believed that this king was a contemporary of Esau. Even though Morié called this particular king "Her Hator I", the 1922 Ethiopian king list reserves this regnal number and name for the king Morié called "At-Hor". Aleka Taye called Her Hator II "Herhator Ertas" on his king list, likely based on Morié's original narrative.According to Morié, "Her Hator II (Erythras)" was a later king who succeeded "Snouka III-Menken" and ruled Aethiopia for 29 years (1314–1285 B.C.), similar to the 30-year figure used on the 1922 Ethiopian king list. "Her Hator II" (meaning "The Supreme Hathor") was a grandson of "Sebi III"/Cepheus through his daughter Andromeda and Perseus. Apparently, little is known of this king's reign and he drowned in Erythraean Sea, which gets its name from king "Her Hator II (Erythras)". This name also influenced the naming of Eritrea. He was supposedly a contemporary of the usurper pharaoh "Arisou", the last ruler of the Nineteenth dynasty (who was actually Queen Twosret). He also named the continent of Africa "Kephenia" in honour of his grandfather. "Her Hator II" had no children."Her Hathor II" was the first of the "Perseides", a dynasty that also included "Her Hathor III" and "Nekhti IV", the next two kings of Morié's narrative.
|
|-
|Her Hator (Za Sagado) III (no. 79)
|According to Louis J. Morié, "Her Hator II" was succeeded by his nephew "Her Hator III (Erythras)", who was the son of Persus, son of Andromeda and Perseus, and king of the Persians. "Her Hator III" reigned for only one year (1285–1284 B.C.), a reign length which is replicated on the 1922 Ethiopian king list. Morié stated that little is known about this king and me may have drowned in the Erythraean Sea rather than his predecessor. Morié also claimed this king was a contemporary of pharaoh "Nekht-Seti", founder of the Twentieth dynasty (this was actually Setnakhte, who reigned from 1189 to 1186 B.C.).
|
|-
|Akate (Za Sagado) IV (no. 80)
|"Her Hator III"'s successor was "Nekhti IV", who reigned for 4 years (1284–1280 B.C.). According to Morié, this king arrived in Aethiopia as head of a Greek or Egyptian colony.

Morié appears to identify this king with several mythical figures:
 Epopeus – King of Lesbos, who committed incest with his daughter Nyctimene
 Apis – A name of several mythical figures, but sometimes called a king of Egypt and equated with Epaphus
 Cinyras – King of Cyprus
 Cronus – Member of the Titans
 Thoas – Name of several mythical figures
 Theias – King of Assyria and father of Adonis
 Asopus – a name used for the gods of the Asopus rivers

Morié is unsure who the parents of "Nekhti IV" are, naming Neptune, "Kelene", Belus, Hyrieus, Bacchus, Apollo and Sandocus as potential candidates. Morié did however name Lycus and Orion as "Nekhti IV"'s brothers. This suggests that Hyrieus is the most likely father of "Nekhti IV", as he had a son named Lycus. In turn, this would suggest that "Nekhti IV" is meant to be identified with Nycteus, who was the brother of Lycus of Thebes and sometimes named as a son of Hyrieus.

"Nekti IV" has several wives:
 Iphigenia – Princess of Mycenae and daughter of king Agamemnon. Morié gave her the alternate name "Metharme" and claimed she was the daughter of "Pygmalion", king of Cyprus. He also claimed she had sons with "Nekhti IV" named "Adonis" and "Oxyponos", as well as 50 daughters including Ida and Myrrha.
 "Kallikopis" – Daughter of "Otreos", king of Phrygia.
 "Amalthea" (also known as "Amentakehat", "Kenkhris", "Kenkhreis", "Arithya", "Adamantea" or "Polyxo") – Daughter of "Melissos", king of Crete (possibly referring to Melisseus). Morié claimed she was the mother of 2 daughters, "Entew" (Antiope) and "Nekht-Amen" (Nyctimene).

According to Morié, "Nekti IV" had many children including:
 Myrrha (also equated with Nyctimene) – In Greek mythology, she was said to have had an incestuous with her father Cinyras, resulting in a son named Adonis. Morié repeats this story, suggesting that "Nekti IV" had a child with his daughter, as Cinyras did. Morié additionally claimed that Myrrha married her uncle "Ameni" or "Ammon".
 Antiope – In some sources on Greek mythology, she was a daughter of Nycteus, wife of Epopeus and mother of Amphion and Zethus.
 "Atomi" (or "Adonis I") – Apparently different from the more famous Adonis. "Adonis I" was married to "Isis" (i.e. Aphrodite) was the father of Golgos, Beroe and "Anemone".
 Oxyporos (or "Oxypnos" or "Oxyponos") – Son of Cinyras in Greek mythology.
 "Paphos" – Possibly Paphos, although he was actually the son of Pygmalion.
 "Marathon" – Possibly Metharme, who was actually a daughter of Pygmalion.
 Braesia – Daughter of Cinyras in Greek mythology.
 Laogora – Daughter of Cinyras in Greek mythology.
 Laodice – Daughter of Cinyras and wife of Elatus.
 Nycteïs – Daughter of Nycteus and Polyxo, wife of Polydorus, king of Thebes, and mother of Labdacus.
 "Ida" – Wife of Tithonus (possibly referring to Eos).
 Orsedice – Daughter of Cinyras in Greek mythology.
 Alcyone – Daughter of Aeolus in Greek mythology.
 Hera – Daughter of Cronus in Greek mythology.
 Hyrmine – Daughter of Neleus or Nycteus in Greek mythology.
 "Entew"/Antiope – Name of various Hellenistic mythological figures.
 "Nekht-Amen"/Nyctimene – Daughter of Epopeus, king of Lesbos, in Greek mythology. The story of her impregnation by her father is repeated by Morié in relation to "Nekhti IV". Morié also equates Nyctimene with Myrrha, mother of Adonis, who also had a child by her father.

According to Morié, "Nekhti IV"'s daughter Antiope fled to the court of king Apis of Argos, who was charmed by her beauty and married her. Apis refused to return Antiope to "Nekhti IV", who then declared war on him. "Nekhti IV" later died of wound he received during a battle. Before his death, "Nekthi IV" asked his brother Lycus to avenge him, and Lycus later killed Apis, which brought an end to the war.
|
|-
|Titon Satiyo (no. 81)
|According to Morié's narrative, "Nekhti IV" was succeeded by "Tetouni" or "Tithon", who reigned for 10 years, from 1280 to 1270 BC. "Tithon" was a foreign prince and was the son of Laomedon of Troy and "Strymo" or "Strymno" (daughter of Scamander), and was a brother of Priam. According to Morié, "Tithon" was a "well built and great warrior" who left Mysia and became a Satrap of Susiana. "Tithon" later seized the country by arms and founded or "embellished" the city of Susa (This may have been inspired by Herodotus's statement that Susa was "the city of Memnon".). "Tithon" attempted a conquest of Aethiopia but was taken prisoner by "Nekhti IV". However, he was later freed after a daughter of the king named "Ait" or "Ida" wished to marry him due to his handsome appearance. "Ait"/"Ida" was the daughter of "Nekhti IV" and "Hapi-aa-kenen" (Iphigenia) according to Morié.
"Tithon" and "Ait" had four sons:
 "Amenemhat-Meiamun" (Memnon) – was "associated" with his father (i.e. co-regent) and was the oldest legitimate son.
 "Her-Mentou"/"Hermathion I" (Emathion?) – 4th son of "Tithonus"; Left Aethiopia and reigned over Emathia in Greece, which later became the Kingdom of Macedon.
 "Khons-Ab" ("Kousch-Avil")
 "Hor-em-heb" ("Eliops") – 5th son of "Tithonus"; Inspired the name of the Greek island Euboea.
"Tithon" also had another son with a concubine:
 "Hermathion II" (Emathion?)
After "Nekhti IV"'s death, "Tithon" ascended the throne of Aethiopia and later took adventage of the troubles the emerged at the end of the Nineteenth dynasty of Egypt with the usurption of "Arisou" (possibly Amenmesse?) and conquered a part of Upper Egypt. "Tithon" gave his son Memnon the title of "Royal son of Abydos", similar to the way that "Prince of Kush" was given to sons of Egyptian pharaohs in the past. (While Morié dated "Tithon"'s reign to coinciding with that of Amenmesse, the later is now known to have reigned over half a century later, around 1200 BC.) "Tithon" reigned during the time of the Trojan war, as recorded in Greek mythology, and sent 10,000 men and 200 war chariots under the command of his son Memnon, who killed many Greeks, including Antilochus. However, Memnon himself was killed after the Aethiopians were ambushed by the Thessalians. Memnon's body was burned and his bones were carried back to his father.
According to Morié, Memnon had several children:
 "Paphlagonios" – son of "Hema", who lived in Asia Minor and gave her name to a stream flowed at the foot of Mount Ida and Paphlagonia in Turkey.
 9 daughters by "Thespia" or "Asope", daughter of "Asopos", who inspired the name of the Asopus river.
However, despite stating all of the above, Morié claims there were several "Memnons" and insisted that the "Memnon" who fought in the Trojan war was actually "Mhamnoun", the son of "Touklat-Adar I" (king of Assyria) and "Eos".
According to Morié, "Tithonus" reached an advanced age and was overwhelmed by infirmiries. Because of this, he took his own life.
"Tithonus" would be succeeded to the throne of Aethiopia by his three sons, "Hermathion II" (son of a concubine), "Memnon" and "Kousch-Avril".
|
|-
|Hermantu I (no. 82)
|According to Morié's narrative, an illegitimate son of "Tithonus" usurped the throne after his death. "Her-Mentou"/"Hermathion" or "Se-Khons"/"Gigon II" was deceitful and cruel and was later killed by Hercules.
|
|-
|Amenemhat II (no. 83)
|Louis J. Morié claimed that Memnon from Greek mythology was an Ethiopian king named "Amenemhat". In Morié's narrative, this king succeeded his half-brother "Her-Mentou"/Emathion and reigned for 5 years, from 1270 to 1265 BC. This reign length and succession placement was replaced on the 1922 Ethiopian king list, though with dates set over a quarter of a century later. "Amenemhat II-Meiamoun" was born and died in Meroe and never went to Troy according to Morié (apparently this "Memnon" is different from the more famous Memnon). However, "Amenemhat II" did fight in a war abroad and was greatly missed by his people. He was initially buried in Meroe but his body was later transferred to Abydos in Egypt. The sites in Abydos called "Memnonia" by Strabo were supposedly named after "Amenemhat II-Meiamoun". The king also was the inventor of the Meroitic script according to Morié, though the earliest surviving examples of it date to the 2nd century BC.
|
|-
|Konsab (no. 84)
|In Morié's narrative, "Tithonus"'s son "Khons-Ab I" (or "Kousch-Avil-Dendan") ruled Aethiopia for 5 years, from 1265 to 1260 B.C. (this reign length was replicated on the 1922 Ethiopian king list). Morié claimed that a civil war erupted in Aethiopia after the death of Memnon due to two rival claimants fighting over the throne. According to Morié the name "Koush-Avil-Dendan" was supposedly recorded by the Assyrians (possibly referring to an Assyrian king) and meant "son of Dendan", referring to "Doudani" (or Tithonus). During the reign of "Khons-Ab I" (or possibly "Khons-Ab II"), Aethiopia experienced a rise in power following a victorious war against Iran. Morié believed that "Thraetaouna" (or Fereydun) invaded lands owned by "Khons-Ab I" and was defeated. Morié theorised that this was not recorded in Persian records because they did not wish to acknowledge their defeats. "Khons-Ab I" himself was defeated by "Khons-Ab II" in 1260 BC and subsequently fled and disappeared, or possibly died in battle. His followers fled to Troy and Cyzicus.
|rowspan="2"|
|-
|Sannib (no. 85)
|"Khons-Ab I" was directly followed by "Khons-Ab II" in Morié's narrative. This second "Khons-Ab" was not recorded in the 1922 Ethiopian king list was recorded in other versions written by Heruy Wolde Selassie and Aleka Taye, suggesting that the name "Sannib" was an error on Tafari's version.According to Louis J. Morié, "Khons-Ab II" was a brother of "Azi-Dahak X" (or "Akhemenes III") and son of "Bakkhemon", who was a son of Perseus. "Khons-Ab II" desired to reclaim the throne of Aethiopia that had once belonged to descendants of Perseus. After several years of civil war, "Khons-Ab II" won and became king in 1260 BC, restoring the throne to the "Perseide" dynasty. He would reign 5 years, a reign length that was replicated on the 1922 Ethiopian king list.Morié claimed this king was a contemporary of Ramesses III (who actually reigned later, around 1186 to 1155 B.C.). According to Morié's narrative, Ramesses III was able to expand the Egyptian empire as far as south as the Tigray Region in modern day Ethiopia, though there is no archeological proof that this happened. The decline of Egyptian power after the reign of Ramesses III meant that Meroe and the Kingdom of Kush would no longer recognize the suzerainty of Egypt.
|-
|Sanuka III (no. 86)
|In Morié's narrative, king "Snouka IV-Menken" or "Snouka IV (Aktisanes)" reigned for approximately 15 years, from c. 1255 to c. 1240 BC. The 1922 Ethiopian king list lowered this reign length to 5 years. Apparently nothing is known of this king except that he was a contemporary of Jephthah.
|
|-
|Amen Astate (no. 88)
|This king reigned for approximately 10 years, from c. 1240 to c. 1230 B.C., according to Morié. The 1922 Ethiopian king list extended this reign length to 30 years. The king was known as "Amen-As-Tat" or "Monostatos", and was a contemporary of Ramesses VI and Ramesses VII, although their actual reign dates do not match with Morié's dating. When Ramesses VII was prince of Kush, a young princess he was engaged to named "Pat-Amen" was kidnapped with her servant by "Amen-As-Tat". The High Priest of Isis, named "Ousir-as-ro", along with three priestesses was able to bring back the princess to be married to Ramesses VII.Louis J. Morié claimed that the next 100 years in Aethiopia after the reign of "Amen-As-Tat" remain shrouded in darkness. Morié noted that Egyptologists of his time theorised that the High Priests of Amun in Upper Egypt founded the kingdom of Napata after being expelled from Egypt at the end of the New Kingdom of Egypt. He believed that this indeed took place, and Napata replaced the kingdom of Meroe, encompassing all of present-day Nubia and Abyssinia up to Aswan (although in reality the Napatan kings are not proven to have ruled over Abyssinia). Morié believed that after the death of the last king of the "Perseides" dynasty, "Her-Hor" entered Aethiopia with an army and was elected king. He was supposedly already the religious leader of the country before this.
|
|-
|Herhor (no. 89)
|According to Louis J. Morié, "Her-Hor" was the first of the "Ammonienne" or "Ammonian" dynasty that ruled at Napata. Regarding the High Priests of Amun, Morié's narrative follows mainstream Egyptology. He states that the weakening power of the Twentieth dynasty of Egypt allowed the High Priests at Thebes to increase their own power in Upper Egypt and eventually claim Pharaonic titles. Morié noted that "Her-Hor" (Herihor) claimed the title "Prince of Kush", possibly referring to the title Viceroy of Kush, which was held by Herihor. "Her-Hor" established his reign in 1100 BC and was recognised in Egypt, Aethiopia and Syria. According to Morié, a civil war erupted in Egypt between Smendes of the Twenty-first dynasty in Lower Egypt and Herihor which lasted 10 years until Herihor was driven out of Egypt. Herihor then fled to Aethiopia and took the tile of King of Napata. He had support from the descendants of the Egyptian High Priests who fled to Aethiopia during the reign of Akhenaten and together they developed a flurishing kingdom in Lower Nubia. "Her-Hor" would be an ancestor of the future Twenty-fifth dynasty of Egypt. This king and his descendants were initially allies of the Assyrian kings. Morié believed that "Her-Hor" introduced the practice of embalming to Aethiopia, where previously the dead were cremated."Her-Hor" first reigned over Egypt from 1110 to 1100 BC, and over Aethiopia from 1100 to 1094 BC. This results in a reign length of 16 years in total over both countries. This reign length was replicated on the 1922 Ethiopian king list. While Morié's dates are not too far removed from modern-day Egyptological dating, the 1922 king list pushes back the reign dates by over 40 years, possibly in an attempt to fill the gap in dates between "Amen-Astat" and "Her-Hor".
|
|-
|Wiyankihi I (no. 90)
|"Piankhi I" (Piankh) was a son and successor of "Her-Hor" in Louis J. Morié's narrative, and apparently did not rule over Upper Egypt. His reign lasted for 9 years from 1094 to 1085 BC. This reign length was replicated on the 1922 Ethiopian king list. Some modern-day Egyptologists however now consider Piankh to actually be Herihor's predecessor. Additionally, Piankh certainly ruled over Upper Egypt  and was Viceroy of Kush.
|rowspan="6"|
|-
|Pinotsem I (no. 91)
|"Piankhi I" was succeeded by his son "Pinotsem I" (Pinedjem I), who reigned for 16 years, from 1085 to 1069 BC. The 1922 Ethiopian king list slightly extended this reign length to 17 years. In Morié's narrative, "Pinotsem I" was able to recover parts of Upper Egypt and was crowned at Thebes. His wife was "Tiouhathor-Honttaoui" (Duathathor-Henuttawy), who was a daughter of "Khonsoumos" and "Tontamoun" (Tentamun). "Pinotsem I" had two children, his successor "Pinotsem II" and a daughter named "Ouait-at-en-Mout" (possibly Mutnedjmet?).
|-
|Pinotsem II (no. 92)
|"Pinotsem II" married princess "Makera" of the Ramesside line to legitimize his rule, and had 2 sons with her named "Masaherta" (Masaharta) and "Ra-men-khoper" (Menkheperre). "Makera" died during in childbirth with their third child, a daughter named "Moutemhat" (Maatkare Mutemhat). "Pinotsem II" reigned for 41 years, from 1069 to 1028 BC. This reign length was replicated on the 1922 Ethiopian king list.Modern-day Egyptology now considers there to be only two High Priests of Amun named "Pinedjem". The information Louis J. Morié relates about "Pinotsem I" and "Pinotsem II" both refer to Pinedjem I.
|-
|Massaherta (no. 93)
|After the death of "Pinotsem II", his younger son "Masaherta" (Masaharta) seized the throne and reigned for 16 years, from 1028 to 1012 BC. This reign length was replicated on the 1922 Ethiopian king list.
|-
|Ramenkoperm (no. 94)
|"Masaherta" was followed to the throne by his brother "Ra-men-khoper" (Menkheperre), who reigned for 14 years, from 1012 to 998 BC. This reign length was replicated on the 1922 Ethiopian king list. "Ra-men-khoper" married his niece "Isi-em-Kheb" (Isetemkheb), a daughter of "Masaherta". They had 3 children:
 "Pinotsem III" – Pinedjem II
 "Tsanaser" or "Djanazer" – Possibly Djedkhonsuefankh?
 "Honttaoui II" – Henuttawy C
|-
|Pinotsem III (no. 95)
|"Pinotsem III" (Pinedjem II), son of "Ra-men-khoper", reigned 6 years, from 998 to 992 BC. The 1922 Ethiopian king list slightly extended this reign length to 7 years. "Pinotsem III" was married to "Neskhonsu" (Neskhons), a daughter of lady "Tonthontthouti" (Takhentdjehuti). "Pinotsem III" and "Neskhonsu" had 4 children:
 "Masaherta II" – Masaharta
 "Sepnower" – Psusennes III?
 "Ataoui" – Itawy
 "Nestenbashrou" – Nesitanebetashru
"Pinotsem III" was a contemporary of Egyptian pharaoh "Psiounkha III Meiamoun (Ra-outshik-Sotep-en-Hor)" (Psusennes II) and king Solomon.
|-
|Sabi IV (no. 96)
|According to Louis J. Morié, there was a dispute over the succession to the throne after the death of "Pinotsem III". The Egyptian pharaoh "Psiounkha III" (Psusennes II) acted as arbitor and appointed "Sebi IV (Képhée)" as the king of Aethiopia. "Sebi IV" resided in "Ioppé" (Jaffa) and his parentage is apparently unknown, though he possibly is identifiable with Psusennes III. However, Morié does state that this king was a relative of Solomon. This later statement may explain why this king was placed close to the reign of Makeda on the 1922 Ethiopian king list. Morié claimed this king reigned for 9 years, from 992 to 983 BC. The 1922 king list extended his reign length to 10 years.Morié's narrative names "Sebi IV"'s successor as "Ro-ke-Amen", a king who does not appear on the 1922 Ethiopian king list and supposedly reigned for 25 years, from 983 to 958 BC. Morié identified "Ro-ke-amen" with Luqman, a wise man who is named in the Quran. This identification could be because Luqman was said to be Nubian, although Morié himself noted he could have been Abyssinian and may have been the same person as Menelik I. "Ro-ke-Amen" married "Neit-akert", a daughter of Egyptian pharaoh Psusennes II (possibly identifiable with Maatkare B, although she actually married Osorkon I). The omission of this king from the 1922 king list could be because the list switches to native Ethiopian tradition after the reign of Sabe IV, and names Tawasaya Dews and his daughter Makeda as the next two monarchs. This chronological placement is particularly important in the case of Makeda, as Ethiopian tradition aligns her reign with the approximate period of king Solomon. It also possible that the author of the 1922 king list agreed with Morié's equating of "Ro-ke-Amen" with Luqman and Menelik I and thus simply inserted Tawasya Dews and Makeda between Sabe IV and Menelik I.
|
|-
|Makeda (no. 98)
|align="left"|The reign dates of 1013–982 B.C. on the 1922 king list may have been inspired by Morie's dating of Solomon's reign to 1004–964 B.C.
|
|-
|Sera I (Tomai) (no. 101)
|The next king after "Ro-ke-Amen" in Louis J. Morié's narrative was his son "Atserk-Amen I", who apparently was Biblical Zerah the Cushite, and reigned for 15 years, from 958 to 943 BC. Morié was sceptical of a theory in mainstream Egyptology that identified Zerah the Cushite with Osorkon I or Osorkon II because Zerah is explicitly described in the Bible as being a king of Aethiopia and Morié believed it was unlikely at this time that the king of Aethiopia was the son of the king of Egypt, unless he had married a daughter of the Egyptian king and was able to seize the throne after the Egyptian king's death. Morié believed that there may have been some confusion over the status of Zerah's relationship to the pharaoh of Egypt, being a son-in-law rather than son of the king. Morié theorised that Zerah was a distinct individual to Osorkon II and was in fact his brother-in-law who raided Egypt on his path to Judah before being defeated by Asa. Morié claimed that archeologists Émile Brugsch and François Lenormant theorized the original name of Zerah to be "Atserk-Amen".The author of the 1922 Ethiopian king list did not use the name "Atserk-Amen" for the name of this king, but instead used the name "Sera" twice, first for the 101st king "Sera I (Tomai)" and secondly for the 104th king "Awseyo Sera II". Both Tomai and Awseyo appear on traditional Ethiopian king lists, but never with "Sera" added to their name. The likely reason is for this is because Louis J. Morié's narrative uses Zerah as an alternate name for the first two kings named "Atserk-Amen" in his line of succession, who both align roughly with the positions of Tomai and Awesyo on the 1922 Ethiopian king list.
|
|-
|Amen Hotep Zagdur (no. 102)
|According to Louis J. Morié, "Atserk-Amen I" was succeeded by his youngest son "Amenhotep", who was a son of "Isinowert" (daughter of Shoshenq I) and reigned for 59 years, from 943 to 884 BC. He was able to retain his father's conquests in Libya but lost control of Thebes in Egypt. The 1922 Ethiopian king list identifies "Amenhotep" with "Zagdur", who is named on pre-1922 Ethiopian king lists, though never with the addition of "Amenhotep" to his name. The addition of the name was likely done to closer match Morié's narrative.
|
|-
|Aksumay Ramissu''' (no. 103)
|King "Amenhotep" was succeeded by his son "Ramessou (Ramses)", who reigned for 27 years from 884 to 857 BC. Apparently little is known of this king according to Morié, except that he built a temple to Ptah in Aethiopias capital. The 1922 Ethiopian king list identifies this king with "Aksumay", who appears on some pre-1922 king lists but never with "Ramissu" added to his name. The shorter twenty-year reign assigned to this king on the 1922 king list may be based on Morié's claim that Ramesses II was "Prince of Kush" and co-ruled with his father for 20 years.
|
|-
|Awseyo Sera II (no. 104)
|In Louis J. Morié's narrative, "Ramessou" was succeeded by "Atserk-Amen II", also known as "Zerakh II", who reigned for 39 years, from 857 to 818 BC. Morié claimed that this king desired to invade the kingdom of Judah during the reign of Jehoram as revenge for the failure of the earlier invasion by "Zerakh I". King "Atserk-Amen II"/"Zerakh II" was apparently responsible for carrying off the whole family of Jehoram except his youngest son Ahaziah, as recorded in the Bible.The 1922 Ethiopian king list identified this king in Morié's narrative with "Awesyo", an Ethiopian king named on pre-1922 king lists who was never previously known as "Sera". The author of the 1922 king list clearly merged Morié's history with the native Ethiopian king lists and kept the order of succession close to Morié's list. The name "Atserk-Amen" was not used for this king on the 1922 king list, but "Zerakh" was retained in the form of "Sera". Morié's reign length of 39 years for this king was shortened slightly to 38 years on the 1922 king list.According to Morié, king "Shakaba I" ascended the throne of Aethiopia 40 years after the reign of "Atserk-Amen II"/"Zerakh II". "Shabaka I" (or "Shabakon I") would reign for 12 years, from 780 to 768 BC, and directly before "Piankhi". The author of the 1922 Ethiopian king list appears to have rejected "Shabaka I" completely and instead chosen to name "Tawasya" as the king who reigned between Sera II and Piyankihi II. The reign length was also extended from 12 years to 21 years. This king, previously known as "Tahawasya" or "Ta'asya", appears on some pre-1922 Ethiopian king lists, sometimes as the successor to Awesyo.
|
|-
|Abralyus Wiyankihi II (no. 106)
|The next king in Louis J. Morié's narrative is "Piankhi II" (i.e. Piye, founder of the Twenty-fifth dynasty of Egypt), who, according to Morié, reigned for 30 years in Aethiopia (761–731 BC) and 10 years in Egypt (741–731 BC). In Morié's narrative, the princes in Egypt implored Piankhi to help them prevent the expansion of territory under the Twenty-fourth dynasty Pharaoh Tefnakht, who ruled at Sais. Piankhi was able to defeat Tefnakht and established a empire stretching from "the Equator to the Mediterranean". It is certainly historically proven that Piye was able to expand the Kingdom of Kush into an empire that included Egypt, and it is also true that Napata was the capital of Kush at the time, as Morié states. Morié however describes this as the sixth conquest of Egypt by Aethiopia and states that it took place in 741 BC, claiming that Piankhi annexed the Theban region, but left the Delta and Middle Egypt as vassals, with Osorkon IV ruling at Sais (although Morié calls him "Osorkon V").The 1922 Ethiopian king list alters "Piankhi"'s names slightly to "Piyankihi" and identifies him with "Abralyus", a king who appears on some pre-20th century Ethiopian king lists. The 1922 king list extended "Piankhi"'s reign to 32 years and pushed his reign dates back by 27 years compared to Louis J. Morié's dating.The next king on the 1922 Ethiopian king list is "Aksumay Warada Tsahay", who does not appear to have been inspired by Morié's book, but rather was simply pulled from earlier Ethiopian king lists, where he was only known as "Warada Dahay".
|
|-
|Kashta Hanyon (no. 108)
|According to Louis J. Morié, "Piankhi II" was succeeded by "Kashta", who reigned for 6 years, from 731 to 725 BC. Modern-day Egyptology considers Kashta to have been Piye/Piankhi's predecessor rather than successor. The 1922 Ethiopian king list called this king "Kashta Hanyon", combining the name "Kashta" with "Hanyon", a king who appears on some earlier Ethiopian king lists under the name "Endor" or "Handadyo". The reign length has also been extended from 6 years to 13 years on the 1922 king list.While Kashta was certainly related to Piye/Piankhi, Morié instead claimed that "Kashta" was of foreign origin and came to the throne by marriage to a daughter of "Piankhi II". "Kashta" was supposedly descended from a Theban family. During his reign, "Kashta" waged war against "Takelot IV", son of "Osorkon V", who ruled in the Delta region of Egypt and desired independence. "Kashta" was also able to defeat "Ahmose the Blind", known as Anysis to the Greeks (although Herodotus, who originally wrote of this event, claimed that Anysis was actually defeated by "Sabacos" rather than Kashta). However, Bakenranef, son of Tefnakht, was able to re-unify Egypt while Kashta was occupied with revolts in Napata and was able to bring the whole of Egypt back under his country, founding the Twenty-fourth dynasty of Egypt, as per Manethoian tradition. "Kashta" had two children, a son named Shabaka and a daughter named "Ameneritis". Modern-day Egyptology supports this familial link.
|
|-
|Sabaka (no. 109)
|In Louis J. Morié's narrative, "Kashta" was succeeded by his son "Shabaka II", who reigned for 10 years in Aethiopia from 725–715 and reigned over Egypt for 12 years from 725–713 BC. The 1922 Ethiopian king list uses the 12-year reign length for king "Sabaka". The king list mistakenly referred to this king as "Sabaka II" even though no prior king of this name appears on the 1922 list. This is likely to Morié numbering the king this way.According to Morié, Shabaka was able to conquer Libya, Cyrenaica and eventually Egypt. Egyptians who were unhappy with Bakenranef, due to his attempts at reforming Egyptian religion, welcomed Shabaka.Morié claimed that Shabaka was succeeded in Egypt by "Shabatoka", who reigned for 21 years from 713 to 692 BC. This king is likely Shebitku, who did actually rule both Egypt and Nubia.
|
|-
|Nicauta Kandake I (no. 110)
|The inclusion of a "Kandake" queen between "Sabaka" and "Tsawi Terhak" may have been inspired by Louis J. Morié's description of Amenirdis I as a "Kantakeh" queen who ruled as regent during the reigns of three Aethiopian kings. It also may have been inspired by Morié's claim that Taharqa brought his mother "Isit" to Egypt and gave her the title of "Great Regent".
|
|-
|Tsawi Terhak Warada Nagash (no. 111)
|In Louis J. Morié's narrative, "Tahraka" ruled Aethiopia for 49 years, from 715 to 666 B.C. and Egypt from 692 to 666 B.C. The reign length of this king was replicated in the 1922 Ethiopian king list.Morié claimed that Taharqa conquered Egypt in 692 B.C. while Shebitku was ruling it (although in reality both ruled Nubia and Egypt and their reigns did not take place next to each other). Shebitku was later taken to Aethiopia and executed. Egypt was temporarily conquered by the Assyrian empire during "Tahraka"'s reign, but he was able to regain control of Egypt. According to Morié, "Tahraka" at his peak ruled over a empire including Libya and North Africa up to the Straight of Gibraltar. Palestine and Assyria were also tributaries to "Tahraka".The 1922 Ethiopian king list calls this king "Terhak" and combines his name with those of two other kings who appear on certain pre-1922 Ethiopian king lists named "Tsawi" and "Warada Nagash". The two names are not known to appear on the same king lists.
|
|-
|Erda Amen Awseya (no. 112)
|In Louis J. Morié's narrative, "Tahraka" was succeeded by his son-in-law "Ourd-Amen I", who ruled ruled Aethiopia for 6 years, from 666 to 660 BC and Egypt for 1 year, from 666 to 665 BC. Morié claimed that when Taharqa married "Amentakehat" (possibly Takahatenamun), she was a widow and had a son named Ourd-Amen, who claimed Thebes after Taharqa's death while the Assyrians took Memphis without difficulty. "Ourd-Amen I" was able to take back the whole of Egypt was recognised as Pharaoh in 666 BC, but was driven out by Ashurbanipal in 665 BC.The 1922 Ethiopian king list retained the 6-year reign length and identified "Ourd-Amen I" with a king named "Awesyo" or "Ausanya", who appears on some pre-1922 Ethiopian king lists as the successor to king "Warada Nagash".
|
|-
|Nuatmeawn (no. 114)
|"Ourd-Amen I" was succeeded by "Nouat-Meiamoun" in Morié's narrative history, and is claimed to have reigned for 3 years over Aethiopia and Egypt, from 660 to 657 BC. "Nouat-Meiamoun" was a son of "Ourd-Amen I" and was elected by the Oracle of Amun in Napata to be king. "Nouat-Meiamoun" invaded Thebes during the early days of his reign and was eventually able to take Memphis and the Delta region, but eventually lost control of most of Egypt after 3 years under unclear circumstances. "Noaut-Meiamoun" is likely to be Tantamani.The 1922 Ethiopian kign list included a king named "Nuatmeawn" at no. 114 and extended his reign length slightly to 4 years. Peter Truhart believed that the name "Nuatmeawn" is an altered version of "Maute" or "Mawat", the name of a king who appears on some pre-1922 king list. "Maute" is usually named as the successor to the short-reigning king "Gasyo" on these lists. This line of succession was replicated on the 1922 king list, which inserts "Gasiyo" between "Erda Amen"/"Ourd-Amen" and "Nautmeawn"/"Nouat-Meiamoun".
|
|-
|Tomadyon Piyankihi III (no. 115)
|According to Louis J. Morié, "Nouat-Meiamoun" was succeeded by "Piankhi III", who was the widower of Amenirdis I. He ruled both Aethiopia and Thebes for 5 years, from 657 to 652 BC. Morié claimed that after "Piankhi III"'s death, his cartouches were hammered out and erased, as if they belonged to a usurper.The 1922 Ethiopian king list extends the reign of this king to 12 years, and names him "Tomadyon Piyankihi". King "Tomadyon" or "Toma Seyon" appears on some pre-1922 Ethiopian king lists.
|
|-
|Amen Asero II (no. 116)
|In Louis J. Morié's narrative, "Piankhi III" was succeeded by "Amenasro II", who ruled over Aethiopia for 2 years, from 652 to 650 BC and over Egypt for 1 year, 652 to 651 BC. He was the son or brother of "Nouat-Meiamoun". Aethiopian power in Egypt came to end during his short reign due to the Ethiopians being expelled from Egypt by Psamtik I and the Assyrians (this actually happened in the reign of Tantamani). The Hermotybian division of the Egyptian military (made of approximately 240,000 Meshwesh warriors) apparently tried to rebel against Psamtik I but later emigrated en masse to Aethiopia. Psamtik begged them to return to Egypt, but one of them supposedly insulted the king by striking his spear in the ground saying that as long as they had weapons they did not need to return to Egypt. He then showed his genitals and said that wherever they go they will not lack food or children. This insult was supposedly was the reason why they were later the called the "Asmakh" (meaning "People on the left of the king") and were called by the Greeks the "Automoles" (Voluntary Emigrants) or "Sembrites". The "Asmakhs" gave themselves to the service of the king in Napata, "Amenasro II", who gave permission to conquer more territory on his behalf. Morié believed that this territory included what later became the Kingdom of Axum. The "Asmakhs" remained in Aethiopia founded a capital city called "Esar" between the Blue Nile and White Nile, where their descendants lived for 300 years and the territory was were the Shilluk Kingdom was later located. Despite the loss of a large part of his army, Psamtik would attempt to conquer Aethiopia and massacred many people there before relocating the southern boundary of Egypt to the second cataract of the Nile, and area called "Dodekaschoinos" by the Greeks. "Amenasro II"'s daughter and heir "Ait" was taken prisoner and given as a slave to Psamtik's daugher "Amen-merit". "Amenasro"'s wife queen "Hatasou" was killed. As revenge, "Amenasro II" waged war against Egypt but was captured by an Egyptian general named "Ramessou" and taken prisoner. However, "Ramessou" had fallen in love with "Ait" and attempted to flee Egypt with both her and her father "Amenasro". However, Psamtik's daughter "Amen-merit", who "Ramessou" was betrothed to, was jealous and foiled this plan. Only "Amenasro" was able to escape Egypt but a group of Egyptians had been sent to find him and he later died while defending his life and freedom. "Ramessou" and "Ait" were sentenced to death."Amenasro II" had two daughters with his wife, including "Ait". According to Morié, his name can be found on a pink granite lion statue discovered at Jebel Barkal. This likely refers to a granite lion statue bearing the name of Amanislo, a Kushite king who reigned in the 3rd century BC. One of "Amenasro II"'s daughters had a son named "Aspourta" who did not immediately succeed "Amenasro".The 1922 Ethiopian king list extended this king's reign to 16 years.
|
|-
|Piyankihi IV (Awtet) (no. 117)
|According to Louis J. Morié, "Amenasro II" was succeeded by "Piankhi IV", who reigned for 34 years, from 650 to 616 BC. "Piankhi IV" was married to "Kenensat", daughter of an Egyptian prince who was descended from the Twenty-second dynasty and princess "Moutiritis", who was a daughter of "Piankhi III" and Amenirdis I.The 1922 Ethiopian king list retained the 34-year reign length for this king, but added "Awtet", a name that appears on some Ethiopian king lists.
|
|-
|Zaware Nebret Aspurta (no. 118)
|"Piankhi IV" was succeeded by "Aspourta", who reigned for 41 years from 616 to 575 BC. According to Morié, "Aspourta" was designated king of Aethiopia and High Priest of Amun by the Orcale of Amun. "Aspourta" was born in Napata and lived there until his death in 575 BC. His wife "Matsenen" (or "Rhodope") was a priestess of Mut and daughter of lady or princess "Nensaou". "Aspourta" and "Matsenen" had a daughter named "Kheb-ha". It is most likely that "Aspourta" is the historical Kushite king Aspelta.The 1922 Ethiopian king list retained the 41-year reign length for king "Aspurta" and added "Zaware Nebrat" to his name. "Zaware Nebrat" is a name that appears on some pre-1922 Ethiopian king lists, usually as the successor of "Awtet", the name given to "Piankhi IV"/"Piyankihi IV" on the 1922 king list.
|
|-
|Saifay Harsiataw (no. 119)
|In Louis J. Morié's narrative, "Aspourta" was succeeded by "Hor-se-atew I", who reigned for 34 years, from 575 to 541 BC. He was born at Napata and waged war against various tribes. Morié believed he was the last of the Napatan and was overthrown after a revolt by the "Meroities".The 1922 Ethiopian king list retained the 34-year reign length for this king and added "Saifay" to his name. The name "Saifay" appears on some pre-1922 Ethiopian king lists, usually as the successor to "Zaware Nebrat", who is identified with "Aspurta".
|
|-
|Ramhay Nastossanan (no. 120)
|The first of the "Meroitic" branch according to Morié. King "Nastosenen" reigned for 16 years, from 541 to 525 BC. He was descended from Cepheus, Perseus and Memnon. Morié claimed that following the Achaemenid conquest of Egypt, a daughter of Psamtik III named "Ashen" fled to Aethiopia and became a wife of "Nastosenen" and ancestress of future Aethiopian kings.The 1922 Ethiopian king list reduced this king's reign to 14 years and added the name "Ramhay". The name "Ramhay" appears on some pre-1922 king lists as the immediate successor of "Safay", "Zaware Nebrat" and "Awtet", who are all identified with the previous three kings of Morié's narrative.
|
|-
|Atserk Amen III (no. 130)
|
|
|-
|Atserk Amen IV (no. 131)
|
|
|-
|Atserk Amen V (no. 133)
|
|
|-
|Atserk Amen VI (no. 134)
|
|
|-
|Nikawla Kandake II (no. 135)
|
|
|-
|Akawsis Kandake III (no. 137)
|
|
|-
|Arkamen (no. 138)
|Morié claimed the Nubian monarchy was hereditary until the time of Taharqa and then became elective, only to return to hereditary succession with king "Erk-Amen I", likely referring to either Arqamani or Arakamani under the Greek name "Ergamenes".
|
|-
|Awtet Aruwara (no. 139)
|
|
|-
|Nikosis Kandake IV (no. 144)
|
|rowspan="2"|
|-
|Ramhay Arkamen II (no. 145)
|
|-
|Messelne Kerarmer (no. 150)
|Morié refers to a number of cities in Sudan, including one named "Mesalamieh" or "Messalanieh".
|
|-
|Akaptah Tsenfa Arad (no. 167)
|Morié names "Ha-ka-ptah" as a child of Zeus.
|
|-
|Horemtaku (no. 168)
|Morié listed names of "kings of the Selenites", who originated from the "country of the Pygmies". One of these kings was called "Hor-em-tekhou".
|
|-
|Garsemot Kandake VI (no. 169)
|
|
|}

Aleka Taye's History of the People of Ethiopia
Aleka Taye Gabra Mariam (1861–1924) was a Protestant Ethiopian scholar, translator and teacher whose written works include books on grammar, religion and Ethiopian history. Taye was sent to Germany in 1905 by Emperor Menelik II to teach Ge'ez and Amharic at the School of Oriental Studies in Berlin, and to recover some rare Ethiopian books that had been taken to Germany. Taye ultimately brought back 130 books for the Emperor.

Taye was ordered by Menelik II to write a complete history of Ethiopia using Ethiopian, European and Arab sources. Taye's work was not published in his lifetime. His book History of the People of Ethiopia was published in Asmara in 1928 (1920 E.C.) and is believed by historiographers to be part of a larger unpublished manuscript that also dealt with the history of the world and the history of the Ethiopian kings. However, the book on the Ethiopian kings was only half-printed due to the Italian Occupation of Ethiopia in 1935 and was never completed. There is also some controversy over whether Taye was truly the author of this book.

As Taye died in 1924, his text would have pre-dated the publication of Charles Fernand Rey's book In the Country of the Blue Nile in 1927 but it is unclear if it pre-dated the writing of Tafari's king list in 1922. It is possible that Taye's text could have influenced Tafari's list, especially as it was written for the benefit of the Ethiopian monarchy in the first place.

Taye's History of the People of Ethiopia contains a king list that matches closely with the one written by Tafari. The names, order, reign lengths and dates of monarchs from the Agadazyan dynasty to the Solomonic dynasty mostly match with what is written on Tafari's list, though with some occasional differences.

Other Ethiopian King Lists

Tafari ultimately did not reveal the sources of information for his king list in his brief cover letter, but there are clear references to Ethiopian tradition and many historically verified kings appearing in later portions of the list. Tafari stated that he had "taken a copy" of the list and sent it to Rey, writing in his cover letter that he would be happy to send more information on the history of Ethiopia if asked again. This would suggest that the king list already existed in some form and that Tafari had simply copied down the information included, possibly from the work of Heruy Wolde Selassie or Aleka Taye mentioned above. In any case, the list was clearly intended to be a royal chronicle of the Ethiopian monarchy presented for an English-speaking and reading audience. E. A. Wallis Budge believed that Tafari's king list was likely compiled by the "most competent of scholars and scribes in Adis Ababa", though likely also contained the "considered opinions of Government officials in Abyssinia".

Manfred Kropp noted that numerous king lists exist that date back to the 13th century and these are reliable documents. However, for the period before this there are only legendary memories of the Axumite rulers. King lists were created to provide a connection between the Solomonic dynasty and the legendary Axumite kings while skipping the Zagwe dynasty. Such lists were written for the purpose of proving the legitimacy of the ruling Solomonic emperors and had information drawn from chronicles held in monasteries. Kropp believed that Ethiopian king lists were intended to fill in the gaps between major events, such as the meeting of Makeda and Solomon, the arrival of Frumentius and the beginning of the Zagwe dynasty. The great variation in names and order between king lists was likely because this process took place across several different monasteries and were also passed on orally.

E. A. Wallis Budge felt that any written information on the period of Ethiopian history before the 13th century was "incomplete" and "untrustworthy". However, he felt that this was likely because any king lists or chronological works held in Axum were likely burned or destroyed before Yekuno Amlak ascended the throne in 1270. Budge noted that numerous king lists were known to exist in which the number and order of kings were rarely the same. He felt that it was clear that the chronographers of Abyssinia from the 13th and 14th centuries "did not know how many kings had reigned over [their country] from the time of Makeda [...] or the exact order of succession". Budge theorized that while the kings lists showed evidence that they were based on legend and tradition, some parts of the list suggested that the scribes did indeed "[have] access to chronological and historical documents of some kind", including Coptic and Arabic texts which were possibly brought over by monks fleeing Egypt and Nubia during the time of the Arab conquests. Some lists began with Adam or David.

European travellers James Bruce, Henry Salt and Carlo Conti Rossini all published different king lists in Europe between the late 18th and early 20th centuries. The lists were written based on information gathered from local Ethiopian scribes. These king lists contain a list of names from Menelik I to Dil Na'od, but both the names and order of kings only occasionally overlap between the different lists, and there are numerous kings who appear on one list but are omitted from another (see Other King Lists for further information). There are also at least two manuscripts held in the British Museum that contain differing king lists covering the same lineage of monarchs. Budge theorised that the existence of multiple king lists were to due to rival claimants to the throne. Tafari's king list noticeably tries to accommodate all these differing traditions by including the majority of the different kings into one longer line of succession.

Two European missionaries in the 16th and 17th centuries, Pedro Páez and Manuel de Almeida, visited Ethiopia and personally saw two different king lists on which they based their respective writings on the history of Ethiopia. The manuscripts likely dated to before 1620. Both Páez and de Almeida stated that the Ethiopian emperor lent them books from the church of Axum containing the king lists. The king lists copied down by Páez and de Almeida include the names of several kings mentioned on Tafari's list as reigning from the 7th to the 10th centuries AD.

Manuel de Almeida read a book from a church at Axum which included a short list of kings of the Zagwe dynasty. This list states that the kings Yemrehana Krestos, Lalibela and Na'akueto La'ab all reigned for exactly 40 years each, with the last king Harbai reigning for 8 years. These reign lengths match those given by Tafari, suggesting he may have used a similar source for his king list. Manuel de Almeida however stated that "those who knew the history better" said that many kings were missing from this list.

A text known as the "Paris Chronicle" includes a list of kings that closely matches the order of kings numbered 247 to 256 on Tafari's list with the exception of Queen Gudit who is not mentioned on the list. The chronicle dates to the eighteenth century. Because the list matches so closely with Tafari's, it can be assumed that a similar text was used to draw up parts of the king list.

Unpublished sources
It is possible that Tafari's king list includes information gathered from sources that have yet to be published or are in private hands. One unpublished text, simply called the Chronicle of Ethiopia, was in the possession of Qesa Gabaz Takla Haymanot of Aksum. The author of this chronicle collected information from various old chronicles from a number of different churches and monasteries, and attempted to compile the information in a "harmonic" way. The chronicle covers information from the reign of Menelik I to Menelik II. Some of the known information from this unpublished chronicle does support elements of Tafari's list.

Kebra Nagast

It is likely the author of the 1922 king list used the Kebra Nagast for information regarding the beginnings of the Solomonic dynasty. The text, also known as The Glory of the Kings, tells of how the Queen of Sheba (Makeda) met King Solomon of Israel, their son Menelik I and how the Ark of the Covenant came to Ethiopia.

The origins of the Kebra Nagast are obscure. A popular belief is that it was written in the 13th or 14th century to legitimise the ruling Solomonic dynasty. However, some historians have suggested that was written in the 6th century to glorify the Axumite king Kaleb. Another hypothesis is that was written before the birth of Christ. The original language of the Kebra Nagast before it was translate into Ge'ez is also debated, with arguments for Arabic, Coptic or Semetic origins all being suggested. Old Testament scholar David Allan Hubbard identified Patristic, Qur'anic, Rabbinical and Aporcyphal texts as sources for the Kebra Nagast. The Kebra Nagast itself claims that the original text was found by the Archbishop of Rome (i.e. Constantinople) in the Church of Saint Sophia and that he read the manuscript claimed the world belonged to the Emperor of Rome and the Emperor of Ethiopia.

The colophon of the Kebra Nagast claims that the text was translated from Arabic in the 14th century during the reign of Amda Seyon I (r. 1314–1344). However, some historians have been suspicious of this statement and have suggested that the authors of the original text itself were Ethiopian scribes. Historian Stuart Munro-Hay stated that there is no record of Ethiopian monarchs claiming descent from Solomon before the 13th century AD.

Historian Gizachew Tiruneh felt that it was most likely that the text was written in the 6th century and was written by Monophysite Christians in Ethiopia. He noted that the Solomonic dynasty had been well established by the 14th century and felt that it was unlikely they would need to be legitimised by this period. Tiruneh also noted that the Kebra Nagast ends with a story that took place in c. 525 AD, when Kaleb of Axum defeated the Jewish king in south Arabia. He also pointed out there was no mention of Islam in the text, despite Muslim incursions into Ethiopia and its neighbours having taken place by this time. Tiruneh further noted that the story of Menelik, son of Makeda and Solomon, was known as far back as the 10th century A.D. in the Alexandrian Church.

Biblical influences

Various Biblical figures are included in this king list. Three of Noah's descendants are named as founders of the first three dynasties; Aram, Ham and Joktan. Gether, son of Aram, and Cush, son of Ham, are both also included as kings on this list. Descendants of Cush named Sabtah, Seba and Sabtechah are also named as kings of Ethiopia. Other Biblical figures include Nimrod, son of Cush, and the Queen of Sheba, whom Ethiopians call "Makeda". Zerah the Cushite may also be included on Tafari's king list under the name "Sera" which is used for two different kings on the list.

According to Ethiopian tradition Makeda was an ancestor of the Solomonic dynasty and mother of Menelik I, whose father was king Solomon of Israel. E. A. Wallis Budge believed that the queen was more likely to have been from Yemen or Hadhramaut than from Ethiopia. He also believed that the tradition of the Queen of Sheba entered the region of modern-day Ethiopia when it was conquered by a Yemeni tribe called the "Habasha", who were "the first to introduce civilization into the country", as theorized by Carlo Conti Rossini. Budge also thought it was possible that the story was introduced via Jewish traders who settled in Abyssinia/Ethiopia. However, by the early 21st century the theory of a south Arabian or 'Sabaean' origin for Ethiopian civilization was largely abandoned by scholars, and thus some of Budge's ideas would now be considered outdated.

The Biblical events of the flood and the fall of the Tower of Babel are both included in the chronology of the king list, dated respectively to 3244 B.C. and 2713 B.C., with the 531-year period in between listed as an interregnum where no kings reigned.

Another Biblical story included is that of the Ethiopian eunuch, named Jen Daraba according to this king list, who visited Jerusalem during the reign of the 169th sovereign Queen Garsemot Kandake VI. However, the version of the story presented by Tafari has some major inaccuracies such as mistakenly stating that Philip the Apostle baptised the eunuch when it was actually Philip the Evangelist according to the Bible.

The following collapsible list names all monarchs on the 1922 king list that originate from or are inspired by the Biblical narrative:

Coptic and Arabic influences

The first dynasty of Tafari's list, the Tribe of Ori, is almost certainly taken from medieval Coptic and Arabic texts on the kings of Egypt who ruled before the Great Flood. French historian Louis J. Morié, in his 1904 book Histoire de L'Ethiopie, recorded an almost identical list of kings and queens to those found on the first dynasty of Tafari's list. Morié stated that the king list he saw was recorded by the Copts in their annals and was found in both Coptic and Arabic tradition. He however felt that the Egyptian Delta would not have been habitable in the Antediluvian era and thus theorized that these kings ruled Thebes and "Ethiopia" (i.e. Nubia). Morié noted that there had originally been a list of 40 kings, but only 19 of them had been preserved up to the early 20th century. He believed that the king list originated from the works of Murtada ibn al-Afif, an Arab writer from the 12th century who wrote a number of works, though only one, titled The Prodigies of Egypt, has partially survived to the present day. The Coptic king list begins with Aram, son of Shem, in the same way that Tafari's king list begins with Aram, otherwise known as Ori.

A medieval Arab text called Akhbar al-Zaman (The History of Time), dated to between 940 and 1140, may have been an earlier version of the king list Morié saw. The authorship is unknown, but may have been written by historian Al-Masudi based on earlier Arab, Christian and Greek sources. Another possible author is Ibrahim ibh Wasif Shah who lived during the Twelfth century. The text contained a list of kings of Egypt who ruled before the Great Flood and shows some similarities with the list of kings of the "Tribe of Ori or Aram" included on Tafari's list, who also ruled before the Great Flood. Several kings show similarities in names and chronological order, though not all kings on one list appear on the other. The kings included on Akhbar al-Zaman are not archeologically verified and do not appear on any ancient Egyptian king lists.

A number of Coptic monks from Egypt came to Ethiopia in the 13th century and brought with them many books written in Coptic and Arabic. These monks also translated many works into Ge'ez. It is possible that the legends from Akhbar al-Zaman may have entered Ethiopia during this time.

Manfred Kropp theorized that this Ethiopian king list may have been influenced by the works of Ibn al-Rāhib, a 13th-century Coptic historian whose works were translated into Ge'ez by Ethiopian writer Enbaqom in the 16th century, and Jirjis al-Makin Ibn al-'Amid, another 13th century Coptic historian whose work Al-Majmu' al-Mubarak (The Blessed Collection) was also translated around the same time. Both writers partially based their information on ancient history from the works of Julius Africanus and through him quote the historical traditions of Egypt as recorded by Manetho. Jirgis was known as "Wälda-Amid" in Ethiopia. Kropp believed that some of the names of the early part of Tafari's king list were taken from a king list included within Jirgis' text which draws upon traditions from Manetho and the Old Testament.

Ancient Egyptian and Nubian influences

Many of the Egyptian and Nubian monarchs included on the list are historically verified but are not proven to have ruled the area of modern-day Ethiopia and Eritrea, and often have reign dates that do no match dates used by modern-day archeologists. The rulers numbered 88 to 96 on the list are the High Priests of Amun who ruled Upper Egypt during the time of the Twenty-first dynasty, whose influence was limited to Lower Egypt. The order of the priests on the list is mostly confirmed by archeology, though their rule did not extend to modern day Ethiopia and Eritrea. Several other kings on the list have names that are clearly influenced by those of Egyptian pharaohs such as Senefrou (8), Tutimheb (53), Amen Emhat I (63), Amen Emhat II (83), Amen Hotep Zagdur (102), Aksumay Ramissu (103) and Apras (127).

Numerous Nubian rulers from the Kushite kingdom in modern-day Sudan are also included on Tafari's king list. In particular, most of the pharaohs of the Twenty-fifth Dynasty of Egypt, who ruled over both Nubia and Egypt, are listed as part of the dynasty of Menelik I. However, the Kushite Pharaohs are not known to have ruled much further south than the area of modern-day South Sudan. Kushite monarchs from after the Twenty-Fifth Dynasty of Egypt are also occasionally mentioned on this list, specifically Aktisanes, Aspelta, Harsiotef, Nastasen and two kings named "Arkamen", whose name could match with various different Kushite kings. Additionally, there are six queens on this list who are referred to as "Kandake", the Meroitic term for the king's sister used by the rulers of Kush.

Apart from the monarchs listed above, there were also some Viceroys of Kush who ruled over Nubia during the time of the New Kingdom after Egypt conquered the Kingdom of Kerma in c. 1500 BC. Some of the names on Tafari's king list may be based on these Viceroys of Kush, including the aforementioned High Priests of Amun from the time of the Twenty-First dynasty.

The reasons for the inclusion of Egyptian and Nubian monarchs may stem from the Axumite conquest of Meroë, the last capital of the Kingdom of Kush, by King Ezana in c. 325 AD. It was from this point onward that the Axumites began referring to themselves as "Ethiopians", the Greco-Roman term previously used largely for Nubians. Following this, the inhabitants of Axum/Ethiopia were able to claim lineage from the "Ethiopians" or "Aethiopians" mentioned in the Bible, including the Kandakes, who were actually Kushites. The claiming of the term "Ethiopian" by the Axumites may, however, pre-date Christianity. For example, Axumite king Ezana is called "King [...] of the Ethiopians" on a Greek inscription where he also calls himself "son of the invincible Mars", suggesting that this pre-dates his conversion to Christianity.

The inclusion of Kushite rulers on the king list suggests that the traditions of ancient Nubia were considered culturally compatible with those of Axum. Makeda, the biblical Queen of Sheba, was referred to as "Candance" or "Queen Mother" in the Kebra Nagast, suggesting a cultural connection between Ethiopia and the ancient kingdom of Kush. Portuguese missionary Francisco Álvares, who travelled to Ethiopia in 1520, recorded one Ethiopian tradition which claimed that Yeha was "the favourite residence of Queen Candance, when she honoured the country with her presence".

As some Egyptian monarchs were able to rule over Nubia, the inclusion of these monarchs on Tafari's king list may have also stemmed from the Axumite conquest of Meroë. Additionally, some Nubian objects from the Napatan and Meroitic periods have been found in Ethiopian graves dating to the 8th to 2nd centuries BC. There have also been discoveries of red-orange sherds similar to those from the pre-Axumite period in sites of the Jebel Mokram Group in Sudan, showing contacts along caravan routes toward the Nile Valley in the 1st millennium BC. This shows that interactions between Nubia and modern day Ethiopia long pre-date the Axumite conquest. Archaeologist Rodolfo Fattovich believed that the people of the pre-Axumite culture had contacts with the kingdom of Kush, the Achaemenid Empire and the Greeks, but that these contacts were "mostly indirect".

Scottish traveler James Bruce, in his multi-volume work Travels to Discover the Source of the Nile included a drawing of a stele found in Axum and brought back to Gondar by the Ethiopian emperor. The stele had carved figures of Egyptian gods and was inscribed with hieroglyphs. E. A. Wallis Budge believed the stele to be a "Cippi of Horus" which were placed in homes and temples to keep evil spirits away. He noted that these date from the end of the Twenty-sixth Dynasty (c. 664–525 BC) onwards. Budge believed this was proof of contacts between Egypt and Axum in the early 4th century BC. Archeological excavations in the Kassala region have also revealed direct contact with Pharaonic Egypt. Some tombs excavated in the Yeha region, the likely capital of the Dʿmt kingdom, contained imported albastron dated to c. 770–404 B.C. which had a Napatan or Egyptian origin.

The earliest known Greek writings that mention "Aethiopians" date to the 8th century BC, in the writings of Homer and Hesiod. Herodotus, in his work Histories (c. 430 BC), defined "Aethiopia" as beginning at the island of Elephantine and including all land south of Egypt, with the capital being Meroe. This geographical definition confirms that in ancient times the term "Aethiopia" was commonly used to refer to Nubia and the Kingdom of Kush rather than modern day Ethiopia. The first writer to use the name "Ethiopia" for the region of the Kingdom of Axum was Philostorgius around 440 AD.

Budge theorised that one of the reasons why the name "Ethiopia" was applied to Abyssinia was because Syrian monks identified Kush and Nubia with Abyssinia when translating the Bible from Greek to Ge'ez. Budge further noted that translators of the Bible into Greek identified Kush with Ethiopia and this was carried over into the translation from Greek to Ge'ez. He argued that it was unlikely that the "Ethiopians" mentioned in ancient Greek writings were the Abyssinians, but instead were far more likely to be the Nubians of Meroë. He believed that the native name of the region around Axum was "Habesh" from which "Abyssinia" is derived and originating in the name of the Habasha tribe from southern Arabia. He did note however that the modern day people of the region did not like this term and preferred the name "Ethiopia" due to its association with Kush. The ancient Nubians are not known to have used the term "Ethiopian" to refer to themselves, however Silko, the first Christian Nubian king of Nobatia, in the early sixth century described himself as "Chieftain of the Nobadae and of all the Ethiopians".

Budge noted that none of the Egyptian and Nubian kings appear on other known king lists from Ethiopia. He believed that contemporary Ethiopian priests had been "reading a modern European History of Egypt" and had incorporated in the king list Egyptian pharaohs who had "laid Nubia and other parts of the Sudan under tribute", as well as the names of various Kushite kings and Priest kings. To support his argument, he stated that while the names of Abyssinian kings have meanings, the names of Egyptian kings would be meaningless if translated into the Ethiopian language. Historian Manfred Kropp likewise noted that no Ethiopian manuscript prior to Tafari's king list included names of monarchs resembling those used by ancient Egyptian rulers.

A comparison of Tafari's list with other known Ethiopian king lists shows that most of the kings on Tafari's list with Egyptian or Nubian names do not have these elements in their names on the other king lists (see Alternate King lists from Menelik I to Bazen). For example, the 102nd king on Tafari's list, Amen Hotep Zagdur, only appears as "Zagdur" on one British Museum manuscript and on Rossini's list. The next king, Aksumay Ramissu, is only known as "Aksumay" on the same two lists. The 106th king, Abralyus Wiyankihi II, only appears as "Abralyus" on the same manuscript. The 111th king, Tsawi Terhak Warada Nagash, is a combination of multiple kings. One king named "Sawe" or "Za Tsawe" is listed as the fifth king following Menelik I, according to one British Museum manuscript and the lists recorded by Bruce and Salt. Another king named "Warada Nagash" is named as the eighth king following Menelik I on a different manuscript. No known list includes both kings, and Tafari's list combined the two different kings as a single entry, with the addition of the name "Terhak", to be equated with the Nubian pharaoh Taharqa, who otherwise does not appear on other Ethiopian king lists. The reason for Taharqa's inclusion is likely because he is mentioned in the Hebrew Bible (2 Kings 19:9; Isaiah 37:9) and was described as the "King of Ethiopia", in reference to Kush in modern-day Sudan. Also missing from other Ethiopian king lists are the six "Kandake" queens numbered 110, 135, 137, 144, 162 and 169. It is likely that these queens refer to the reigning female monarchs of Kush, although it is unclear who exactly they are based on as their names do not match any known queens of Kush. The second Kandake queen, Nikawla (no. 135), has a name which was sometimes used to the refer to the Queen of Sheba.

If Budge is correct in his assumption that the inclusion of Egyptian and Nubian monarchs was largely due to contemporary European Egyptological writings, then this may explain why the High Priests of Amun of the early Third Intermediate Period were included on Tafari's king list numbered 88 to 96. In the late 19th and early 20th centuries, several major Egyptologists (such as Heinrich Brugsch, James Breasted and George Reisner) believed that the rise of the Kush kingdom was due to the influence of the High Priests of Amun moving into Nubia towards the end of the Twentieth Dynasty because of political conflict arising at the end of the New Kingdom. Brugsch in particular entertained the idea that the early Kushite kings were lineal descendants of the priests from Egypt, though this was explicitly rejected by Breasted. Later Egyptologists A. J. Arkell and Walter Emery theorized that a priestly "government in exile" had influenced the Kushite kingdom. Budge himself would agree with these ideas and suggested that the High Priests of Amun moved south to Nubia due to the rise of the Libyan pharaohs in Lower Egypt, and consolidated their high position by intermarrying with Nubian women. Budge further theorised that the name of the Nubian pharaoh Piye or "Piankhi" was taken from that of the High Priest of Amun Piankh and he was possibly Piankh's descendant. Such ideas around the Kushite monarchy originating from this specific line of priests are now considered outdated, but the popularity of these theories in the early 20th century could explain their inclusion, in almost exact chronological order, on Tafari's king list from 1922.

The following collapsible list names all monarchs on the 1922 king list that originate from or are inspired by Egyptian rulers or gods:

The following collapsible list names all monarchs on the 1922 king list that originate from or are inspired by Kushite rulers:

Greek influences

The ancient Greek mythical queen of Aethiopia, Cassiopeia, is claimed as part of Ethiopia's ancient history according to Tafari's list, which lists her as the 49th monarch and the third of the Agdazyan dynasty. Her grandson Electryon also makes an appearance on this list, though oddly he is placed six centuries before Cassiopeia, as part of the Tribe of Kam. Cassiopeia's husband, Cepheus also makes an appearance on the king list, but is numbered 71st and is dated to over 400 years after her reign.

The legendary Cretian king Minos is listed as the 66th monarch under the name "Mandes", a variation of the name used by Diodorus in his work Bibliotheca Historia, though oddly he was listed as a king of Egypt in Diodorus' text rather than Crete. Diodorus' text seems to have influenced other parts of the king list, such as the 122th monarch named "Sabakon" (an alternate name for the Nubian pharaoh Shabaka, who is already mentioned earlier in the list) and the 127th monarch named "Apras", the Greek name for Egyptian pharaoh Wahibre Haaibre.

In addition to the above, the Egyptian king Proteus is also included on the list as part of the Agdazyan dynasty, however he only appears in Greek writings and is otherwise unattested in the Egyptian archeological record.

Memnon, a mythical king of "Aethiopia" who fought in the Trojan war, is not directly mentioned on Tafari's king list. However, he may be named "Amen Emhat", a name used by several Egyptian pharaohs that may have inspired the name "Memnon". Peter Truhart identified the 83rd king of Tafari's list, "Amen Emhat II", as Memnon and the 81st king, "Titon Satiyo", as Memnon's father Tithonus.

The following collapsible list names all monarchs on the 1922 king list that originate from or are inspired by Greek mythology:

Conflict with other Ethiopian traditions

Tafari's list occasionally does not match with other Ethiopian traditions. One example is Abreha and Atsbeha, who are believed by Ethiopians to have been two brothers who brought Christianity to Ethiopia. However, Tafari lists 'Abreha Atsbeha' as a single monarch numbered 201st on his list and as a son of queen Sofya. In reality, the son of Sofya was king Ezana who was the first Christian king of Axum. Ezana is however placed much later in the list, over 150 years after the reign of Sofya. Queen Sofya ruled as a regent for her son Ezana, though Tafari considers her to be a reigning monarch in her own right, even allowing for her regency to be counted as a period of co-rule with her son. The listing of 'Abreha Atsbeha' as a single figure may be a transcribable error, as Aleka Taye's version of the king list clearly states that 'Abreha' and 'Atsbeha' are two separate individuals.

Another example is that of king Angabo I, who is placed in the middle of the Agdazyan dynasty on the 1922 king list. However some Ethiopian legends claim that this king was the founder of a new dynasty. In both cases the dating is given as the late 14th century BC.

E. A. Wallis Budge noted that there were differing versions of the chronological order of the Ethiopian kings, with some lists stating that a king named Aithiopis was the first to rule while other lists claim that the first king was Adam. Tafari's list instead begins with Aram.

The list also has its own internal conflicting information. Tafari claims that it was during the reign of the 169th monarch, queen Garsemot Kandake VI, in the first century AD when Christianity was formally introduced to Ethiopia. However, this is in direct conflict with the story of the later queen Sofya, who ruled 249 years later.

List of monarchsGregorian Dates: Tafari's king list uses dates according to the Ethiopian Calendar. According to Charles Fernand Rey, one can estimate the Gregorian date equivalent by adding a further seven or eight years to the date. As an example, he states that 1 AD on the Ethiopian calendar would be 8 AD on the Gregorian calendar. He notes that the calendar of Ethiopia likely changed in some ways throughout history but argued that this was a good enough method for estimates. E. A. Wallis Budge stated that the Ethiopian calendar was 8 years behind the Gregorian calendar from 1 January to 10 September and 7 years behind from 11 September to 31 December.

Tribe of Ori or Aram (1,286 years)
"Tribe or Posterity of Ori or Aram"

The first dynasty of Tafari's king list consists of 21 monarchs who ruled before the Biblical "Great Flood". This dynasty is almost certainly legendary and borrowed from a list of pre-flood kings of Egypt that is found in Coptic and Arab texts. French historian Louis J. Morié recorded a similar list of 19 monarchs in his 1904 book Histoire de L'Éthiopie. These kings are not archeologically verified and it is likely that the stories around them developed in later times. The medieval Arab text Akhbar al-Zaman contains a king list that may have been an earlier version of the list Morié saw centuries later. This list contained a total of 19 kings and the majority had similar names to those found on the later version in 1904 (See the Akhbar al-Zaman section of this article for more information on this text). Morié noted that the kings were supposed to be rulers of Egypt, but believed that they had actually ruled what he referred to as "Ethiopia", although he specifically was writing about Nubia. He pointed to a story of the third king, Gankam, who had a palace built beyond the Equator at the Mountains of the Moon, as proof that these kings resided in Aethiopia. The kings of this dynasty are described as Priest-kings in Coptic tradition and were called the "Soleyman" dynasty. Louis J. Morié may well have been the inspiration behind the appropriation of this legendary Egyptian dynasty into the Ethiopian king list as his book shows clear influence over the next two dynasties of this king list. While the original Coptic tradition called the first king "Aram", this king list calls the king "Ori or Aram". The name "Ori" may have originated from Morié's claim that this dynasty was called the "Aurites", and that Aram had inspired the name of his country, which was called "Aurie" or "Aeria".

The "Soleyman" dynasty was said to have been "Priest-kings" who ruled before the Great Flood for 9,000 years, though Morié personally believed the period of rule was closer to 2,000 years. Their capital city was called either "Fanoun" or "Kanoun" and they ruled over much of North and East Africa according to Coptic legend. They also founded other cities named "Gevherabad" (capital of the province of "Schadoukiam"), "Ambarabad" (or "Anbarabad") and "Gabkar" and used a now lost language called "Bialban".

Due to its non-native origin, the tradition of the Ori/Aram dynasty has often been treated as irrelevant to wider Ethiopian tradition. Ethiopian writer and foreign minister Heruy Wolde Selassie ignored this dynasty in his book Wazema. Ethiopian historian Fisseha Yaze Kassa, in his book Ethiopia's 5,000-year history, completely omitted this dynasty and instead begins with the Ham/Kam dynasty. In his book Regents of Nations, Peter Truhart described this dynasty as "non-historical".

Other Ethiopian traditions name a completely different line of kings as the first to rule Ethiopia. Egyptologist E. A. Wallis Budge stated that in his time the contemporary Ethiopians could not "tell us [anything] about the reigns of their [pre-Flood] kings" and relied on Biblical genealogy for a list of names. The list that Budge provided for the pre-Flood kings varies considerably from the one on Tafari's list (see Other King Lists section below), essentially using the Biblical genealogy from Adam to Solomon. Budge noted that some Ethiopian king lists stretched back to 5500 B.C. (the year the world was believed by the Ethiopians to have been created) and began with Adam. Other Ethiopian traditions instead state that the Ethiopians descend from Ham, a grandson of Noah. There are some brief king lists that outline a genealogy from Ham and his son Cush to kings representing Ethiopia and Axum.

By contrast, Tafari's list names neither Adam or Ham as the founder of the Ethiopian line, but instead chooses Aram, son of Shem, a grandson of Noah, to be the "great ancestor" of the Ethiopian monarchy. E. A. Wallis Budge believed that the reason for this was because contemporary Ethiopians wanted to distance themselves from Ham and the Curse of Ham. The Curse of Ham had been used as an ideological justification for the Atlantic slave trade during the 16th to 19th centuries. Likewise, it was also used to justify the European Scramble for Africa during the 1880s to 1910s, when nearly 90 percent of Africa was colonized by European powers and Ethiopia was one of only two countries to remain independent (the other being Liberia). The medieval Ethiopian text Kebra Nagast stated that "God decreed sovereignty for the seed of Shem, and slavery for the seed of Ham". The original writer of Tafari's king list appears to have deliberately relegated Ham to being the founder of the second Ethiopian dynasty instead of the first dynasty as was done on older king lists.

The only rulers of this dynasty who do not originate from the Coptic Antediluvian king list are "Senefrou" and "Assa", which E. A. Wallis Budge equated with the Egyptian pharaohs Sneferu and Djedkare Isesi. The historical reign dates of these pharaohs are far later than what is stated on this king list. Their inclusion as rulers of Ethiopia may be due to some kind of interaction with Nubia (i.e. "Aethiopia").

One issue with the Ori dynasty is that the king list dates the Great Flood to 3244 B.C. and yet states that Aram, who was born after the Flood, ruled over 1,200 years before it took place. This also causes problems with the dating given for Gether and Nimrod who both lived after the Flood.

Interregnum (531 years)

"From the Deluge until the fall of the Tower of Babel".

This 531-year period is the only gap in Tafari's king list where no monarchs are named. Tafari leaves this gap unexplained, but some older Ethiopian king lists state that the monarchs who reigned between the Great Flood and the fall of the Tower of Babel were pagans, idolators and worshippers of the "serpent", and thus were not worthy to be named.

The Tower of Babel was, according to the Bible, built by humans in Shinar at a time when humanity spoke a single language. The tower was intended to reach the sky, but this angered God, who confounded their speech and made them unable to understand each other and caused humanity to be scattered across the world. This story serves as an origin myth to explain why so many different languages are spoken around the world. The builder of the Tower, Nimrod, reigned 1,063 years before it fell according to this king list.

The dating of the fall of the tower to directly before the beginning of the Kam dynasty suggests that it was at this point that Ham came to Aethiopia and became its king.

Tribe of Kam (728 years)

"Sovereignty of the tribe of Kam after the fall of the tower of Babel."

This dynasty begins with the second son of the Biblical prophet Noah, Ham, whose descendants populated the African continent and adjoining parts of Asia according to Biblical tradition. Ham was the father of Cush (Kush/Nubia), Mizraim (Egypt), Canaan (Levant) and Put (Libya or Punt). One of Ham's descendants, Nimrod, is named as part of the previous dynasty which raises questions over how closely Tafari's Ethiopian king list is following Biblical tradition.

According to Heruy Wolde Selassie's book Wazema, the Kamites originated from the Middle East and conquered Axum, Meroe, Egypt and North Africa.

Most Ethiopian traditions present a very different line of kings descending from Ham. E. A. Wallis Budge stated that in his time there was a common belief in Ethiopia that the people were descended from Ham, his son Cush and Cush's son Ethiopis, who is not named in the Bible, but from whom the country of Ethiopia gets its name. Budge however found it doubtful that the Kushites were the first to inhabit the region of modern-day Ethiopia. Nonetheless, Ham has often been considered the founder of Ethiopia according to many Ethiopian king lists. Some lists explicitly state the names "Ethiopia" and "Axum" come from descendants of Ham that are not named in the Bible. See Alternate Hamitic dynasty section below for more information.

Ethiopian historian Fisseha Yaze Kassa's book Ethiopia's 5,000-year history begins this dynasty with Noah and omits Habassi, but otherwise has a similar line of kings as this list. Heruy Wolde Selassie omitted the first three rulers of this dynasty in his book Wazema and begins the dynasty with Sebtah in 2545 BC.

Peter Truhart, in his book Regents of Nations, dated the monarchs of this dynasty to 2585–1930 BC and stated that the capital during this period was called 'Mazez'. He believed that the first king Kam was a representation of Egypt (or "K.mt") and a reference to Egyptian contacts with the Land of Punt (or modern-day Ethiopia as Truhart identifies it) that took place around 3000 BC. He thus identifies king Kout as the first king of this dynasty instead of Kam. Truhart identified the monarchs from Kout to Lakniduga as the "Dynasty of Kush" based at 'Mazez' and ruled from 2585 to 2145 BC, while the monarchs from Manturay to Piori I are listed as the "Kings of Ethiopia and Meroe" who ruled from 2145 to 1930 BC.

Agdazyan Dynasty (1,003 years)

"Agdazyan dynasty of the posterity of the kingdom of Joctan."Note: Historian Manfred Kropp stated the word "Agdazyan" is likely a transcribal error and meant to say "Ag'azyan", as the Ethiopian syllable signs da and 'a are relatively easy to confuse with each other.

The third dynasty of this king list is descended from Joktan, a son of Eber, grandson of Shem and great-grandson of Noah. The first ruler of the dynasty, Akbunas Saba, is likely meant to be Sheba, son of Joktan. The dynasty ends with the famous Queen of Sheba, whose name is Makeda in Ethiopian tradition. According to Genesis 10:7 and 1 Chronicles 1:9, Sheba was a grandson of Cush through Raamah, which provides a link between this Semitic dynasty and the Hamitic dynasty that preceded it. The so-called Agdazyan dynasty includes a number of kings whose names clearly reference ancient Egypt and Kush, most notably the line of High Priests of Amun that reigned near the end of this dynastic period. While most of these monarchs are archaeologically verified, they did not rule modern-day Ethiopia, but rather ruled over or had some contact with ancient Nubia and Kush, which is equated with Ethiopia in some translations of the Bible and these translated editions have influenced modern Ethiopia's belief in an affinity with ancient Nubia.

This section of the king list is heavily influenced by Louis J. Morié's book Histoire de L'Éthiopie, with the majority of monarchs having similar names and line of succession to those found in Morié's book. Much of Morié's book cannot be considered historically accurate, as it was written over a century ago and largely attempts to fit contemporary Egyptological knowledge within the Biblical narrative. Historian Manfred Kropp identified this book as a key source in the creation of the 1922 Ethiopian king list as a whole, and felt that it was more imaginative than scientific in its approach to the history of Aethiopia. Morié's claim that Sabaeans came to Aethiopia during the reign of either pharaoh Pepi I or Pepi II may have inspired the narrative of a "Sabaean" dynasty ruling Ethiopia, as claimed by the 1922 king list.

While this dynasty takes inspiration from foreign sources, it does include some notable kings that developed within indigenous tradition. Specifically, five monarchs are named in native Ethiopian sources as rulers from distant ancient times, these being Angabo I (no. 74), who founded a new dynasty after killing the serpent king Arwe, and his successors Zagdur I (no. 77), Za Sagado (no. 80), Tawasya Dews (no. 97) and Makeda (no. 98), the last of whom is identified with the Queen of Sheba (See Angabo dynasty for more information). The 1922 king list incorporates these five rulers within the longer narrative of Louis J. Morié. There is also another king named Ethiopis, who Ethiopian tradition credits with inspiring the name of the country Ethiopia.

The word Ag'azyan means "free" or "to lead to freedom" in Ge'ez. According to Heruy Wolde Selassie in his book Wazema, this originated from the liberation of Ethiopia from the rule of the Kamites/Hamites. Selassie also claimed that three of Joktan's sons divided Ethiopia between themselves. Sheba received Tigray, Obal received Adal and Ophir received Ogaden. If this is to be believed, then presumably the later monarchs who followed Sheba/Akbunas Saba ruled from the Tigray Region. It is unclear who ruled the other territories and whether they ever came under rule of the Tigrayian monarchs in later times. It is possible that Sheba/Akbunas Saba may have conquered the other territories and thus became king of all of Ethiopia.

E. A. Wallis Budge had a different theory of the origin of the term Aga'azyan, believing that it referred to several tribes that migrated from Arabia to Africa either at the same time as or after the Habashat had migrated. He stated that the word "Ge'ez" had come from "Ag'azyian". The term "Agdazyan" may also refer to the Agʿazi region of the Axumite empire located in modern-day Eastern Tigray and Southern Eritrea

Sheba is usually considered by historians to have been the south Arabian kingdom of Saba, in an area that later became part of the Aksumite Empire. The Kebra Nagast however specifically states that Sheba was located in Ethiopia. This has led to some historians arguing that Sheba may have been located in a region in Tigray and Eritrea, which was once called "Saba". American historian Donald N. Levine suggested that Sheba may be linked with the historical region of Shewa, where the modern Ethiopian capital Addis Ababa is located. Additionally, a Sabaean connection with Ethiopia is evidenced by a number of settlements on the Red Sea coast that emerged around 500 BC and were influenced by Sabaean culture. These people were traders and had their own writing script. Gradually over time their culture merged with that of the local people. The Sabaean language was likely the official language of northern Ethiopia during the pre-Axumite period (c. 500 BC to 100 AD).

Some historians believe that the kingdom of Dʿmt was Sabaean-influenced, possibly due to Sabaean dominance of the Red Sea or due to mixing with the indigenous population.Nadia Durrani, The Tihamah Coastal Plain of South-West Arabia in its Regional context c. 6000 BC - AD 600 (Society for Arabian Studies Monographs No. 4) . Oxford: Archaeopress, 2005, p. 121. D'mt had developed by the first millennium B.C. in modern-day northern Ethiopia and Eritrea, and had "a veneer of cultural affinities adopted largely from the Saba'an culture centred across the Red Sea in the area of modern Yemen". The D'mt area had a written language that appeared "almost entirely Saba'an in origin". Historian Jacke Phillips argued that "some form of underlying political unification must have allowed its dispersal".

Older hypotheses on the origin of the pre-Axumite culture suggested that it developed due to migrations of population from south Arabia in pre-modern times or that there had been some kind of Sabaean colonization of the modern-day Ethiopia/Eritrea region. More recent theories instead suggest that the culture developed out of a long process of contacts dating back to the 2nd millennium BC.

Taking into account the proof of Sabaean-Ethiopian contacts, this dynasty, while likely legendary, is nonetheless a clear reference to the historical interactions with southern Arabia that occurred in the ancient past and influenced Ethiopian culture and tradition. The mix of Egyptian, Nubian, Greek and Biblical figures in this dynasty showcases the many cultural interactions that Ethiopians had with their neighbours.

Roman-Jewish historian Josephus wrote that that Achaemenid king Cambyses II conquered the capital of Aethiopia and changed its name from "Saba" to "Meroe". Josephus also stated the Queen of Sheba came from this region and was queen of both Egypt and Ethiopia. This suggests that a belief in a connection between Sheba and Kush was already in place by the 1st century AD. Josephus also associated Sheba/Saba with Kush when describing a campaign led by Moses against the Ethiopians, in which he  won and later married Tharbis, the daughter of the king of 'Saba' or Meroe.

Due to the alleged Sabaean origin of this dynasty, it is possible that some of the names of kings may be drawn from a south Arabian tradition that identifies a legendary figure named Qahtan (ancestor of the Qahtanite Arabs) with the Biblical figure Joktan. The Arab genealogy from Joktan names his great-grandson as Saba (representing the Sabaean kingdom or "Sheba") and his great-great-grandson Kahlan (who represents an Arab confederation in Ancient Yemen). Saba and Kahlan may be represented by the first two kings of this dynasty, Akbunas Saba and Nakehte Kalnis, due to the similarity of their names.

This dynasty is notable for including a line of Egyptian High Priests of Amun numbered 88 to 96 which closely matches archaeological evidence but is not entirely correct. Manfred Kropp felt that these monarchs were the clearest borrowings from Egyptological knowledge and he theorized that Heruy Wolde Selassie deliberately altered the chronological order when writing this king list.

Peter Truhart, in his book Regents of Nations, dated the kings from Akbunas Saba II to Lakndun Nowarari to 1930–1730 BC and listed them as a continuation of the line of "Kings of Ethiopia and Meroe" that begun in 2145 BC. However, Truhart's king list then jumps forward and dates the kings from Tutimheb onwards as contemporaries of the Eighteenth and Nineteenth dynasties of Egypt, with a date range of 1552–1185 BC. Truhart also identified modern-day Ethiopia with the Land of Punt. His list however omits the High Priests of Amun from Herihor to Pinedjem II without giving a clear reason. Despite this, he still acknowledges the rule of the High Priests in Thebes as taking place from c. 1080 to 990 BC.

Dynasty of Menelik I (1,475 years)
A new dynasty begins with Menelik I, son of Queen Makeda and King Solomon. The Ethiopian monarchy claimed a line of descent from Menelik that remained unbroken — except for the reign of Queen Gudit and the Zagwe dynasty — until the monarchy's dissolution in 1975. Tafari's 1922 king list divides up the Menelik dynasty into three sections:
 Monarchs who reigned before the birth of Christ (982 B.C.–9 A.D.)
 Monarchs who reigned after the birth of Christ (9–306 A.D.)
 Monarchs who were Christian themselves (306–493 A.D.).

Additionally, a fourth line of monarchs descending from Kaleb is listed as a separate dynasty on this king list but most Ethiopian king lists do not acknowledge any dynastic break between Kaleb and earlier monarchs. This line of monarchs is dated to 493–920 A.D. and is made up of the last kings to rule Axum before it was sacked by Queen Gudit. The line of Menelik was restored, according to tradition, with the accession of Yekuno Amlak.

Heruy Wolde Selassie considered Makeda to be the first of a new dynasty instead of Menelik.

Monarchs who reigned before the birth of Christ (991 years)

Ethiopian tradition credits Makeda with being the first Ethiopian monarch to convert to Judaism after her visit to king Solomon, before which she had been worshipping Sabaean gods. However, Judaism did not become the official religion of Ethiopia until Makeda's son Menelik brought the Ark of the Covenant to Ethiopia. While Ethiopian tradition asserts that the kings following Menelik maintained the Jewish religion, there is no evidence that this was the case and virtually nothing is known of Menelik's successors and their religious beliefs.

Other Ethiopian king lists, based on either oral or textual tradition, present an alternate order and numbering of the kings of this dynasty (see Alternate King lists from Menelik I to Bazen). If any other Ethiopian king list is taken individually, then the number of monarchs from Menelik I to Bazen is not enough to realistically cover the claimed time period from the 10th century B.C. to the birth of Jesus Christ. Tafari's list appears to try to bring together various different king lists into one larger list by naming the majority of kings that are scattered across various oral and textual records regarding the line of succession from Menelik. The result is a more realistic number of monarchs reigning over the course of ten centuries. Of the 67 monarchs on Tafari's list from Menelik I to Bazen, at least 40 are attested on pre-20th century Ethiopian king lists.

Tafari's king list names various Nubian and Egyptian rulers as part of Menelik's dynasty. These Nubian and Egyptian rulers did not follow the Jewish religion, so their status as alleged successors of Menelik calls into question how strong the 'Judaisation' of Ethiopia truly was in Menelik's reign. In several cases, the kings do not have Egyptian and Nubian elements in their names on king lists from before the 20th century and it appears that these elements were added in the 20th century to provide a stronger link to ancient Kush. The influence for the addition of Egyptian and Kushite names is likely Louis J. Morié's Histoire de l'Éthiopie, which clearly influenced the names and regnal order of the previous dynasties on this king list.

Peter Truhart, in his book Regents of Nations, believed that an "Era of Nubian Supremacy" began with the reign of Amen Hotep Zagdur, as from this point onwards many kings' names show clear links to the kings of Napata and Kush. Truhart believed that the kings from Safelya Sabakon to Apras were likely related to or possibly identifiable with the Pharaohs of the Twenty-fifth and Twenty-sixth dynasties (c. 730–525 BC). He additionally believed that an "Era of Meroen Influence" began with the reign of Kashta Walda Ahuhu.

Some historians refer to this dynasty as the "Solomon" dynasty, in reference to its claimed descent from king Solomon and because of the use of the term to the refer to the later Solomonic dynasty that was descended from this earlier line of kings.

Monarchs who reigned after the birth of Christ (297 years)Text accompanying this section:"These thirty-five sovereigns at the time of Akapta Tsenfa Arad had been Christianised by the Apostle Saint Matthew. There were few men who did not believe, for they had heard the words of the gospel. After this Jen Daraba, favourite of the Queen of Ethiopia, Garsemat Kandake, crowned by Gabre Hawariat Kandake, had made a pilgrimage to Jerusalem according to the law of Orit (the ancient law), and on his return Philip the Apostle taught him the gospel, and after he had made him believe the truth he sent him back, baptising him in the name of the trinity. The latter (the Queen's favourite), on his return to his country, taught by word of mouth the coming of our Saviour Jesus Christ and baptised them. Those who were baptised, not having found an Apostle to teach them the Gospel, had been living offering sacrifices to God according to the ancient prescription and the Jewish Law."

Despite the text above claiming that Christianity was introduced to Ethiopia during this line of monarchs, Charles F. Rey pointed out that this retelling of events contradicts both the known information around the Christianisation of Ethiopia and the story of Queen Ahwya Sofya and Abreha Atsbeha in the next section.

The story of Garsemot Kandake VI and Jen Daraba may have been influenced by the biblical story of the Ethiopian eunuch, who was the treasurer of Kandake, queen of the Ethiopians and was baptised after travelling to Jerusalem. However, the eunuch was actually baptised by Philip the Evangelist, not Philip the Apostle as Tafari mistakenly states. The apparent contradiction in story of the Christianisation of Ethiopia according to this king list is likely due to an attempt to accommodate both the native Ethiopian tradition around Abreha and Atsbeha and the Biblical traditions of "Ethiopia" (i.e. Nubia).

It is possible that some of these monarchs were the earliest kings of Axum. This section is also the last part of the king list that directly refers to ancient Nubia and the Kingdom of Kush, which came to an end in the 4th century AD following its conquest by Ezana.

Peter Truhart believed that the line of Axumite kings begins with Gaza Agdur (no. 188) and dated the beginning of his reign to c. 150.Note: All monarchs numbered 166 to 200 (with the exception of 168 and 169) appear on other Ethiopian king lists (see Alternate King lists from Bazen to Abreha and Atsbeha). The other lists suggest there are multiple distinct traditions regarding the order of succession from Bazen to Abreha and Atsbeha, which this king list attempts to combine into a longer line of succession. Numerous monarchs also have their names expanded or altered specially for the 1922 king list.

Christian Sovereigns (187 years)
"Chronological table of the Christian sovereigns who received baptism and followed completely the law of the Gospel."

Brothers Abreha and Atsbeha are frequently cited in Ethiopian tradition as the first Christian kings of Ethiopia, although Tafari's list strangely considered them to be one person and this may have been an error that arose when transcribing the list. According to Tyrannius Rufinus, Christianity was introduced to this region by Frumentius and his brother Edesius. They were sailing down the Red Sea with a Syrian merchant named Meropius when they landed on the coast and were seized by the native people, who spared the two brothers and took them to the king. Frumentius was made the king's chancellor and Edesius was made cupbearer or butler. After the king's death, the widowed queen asked both men to stay until her son was grown up and Frumentius assisted her in ruling the kingdom. During his time in power, Frumentius had many churches built and obtained facilities to allow more trade with Christians and years later asked Athanasius, the Pope of Alexandria, to send a bishop to Abyssinia to teach the Christians there who had no leader. E. A. Wallis Budge believed that the brothers had initially arrived at Adulis.

Tafari's king list appears to reflect the above tradition by specifically crediting Frumentius, under the name of Aba Salama, with introducing Christianity during the rule of queen Ahywa Sofya, who is likely intended to be the widowed queen of the story.

According to Tyrannius Rufinus, the Axumites converted to Christianity during the reign of the Roman Emperor Constantine I (306–337). The dating of Tafari's list aligns with this narrative.

John Stewart's book African States and Rulers provides alternate reign dates and succession order for these monarchs, likely based on alternate Ethiopian traditions and legends surrounding this dynasty.

Peter Truhart believed that a "period of disintegration" began with the reign of Queen Adhana I during which there may have been multiple reigning monarchs at the same time. Truhart dated this period to c. 375–450. E. A. Wallis Budge previously stated that he believed there were "kinglets" who ruled parts of Ethiopia between 360 and 480 separate from other lines of kings. This theory was used to explain why there was so much variation between different Ethiopian king lists. Budge identified most of the monarchs from Adhana I to Lewi as "kinglets", while the later kings were those who appear more frequently on king lists.

Dynasty of Atse (Emperor) Kaleb until Gedajan (427 years)

The majority of the following monarchs are attested on other king lists (see Alternate King lists from Abreha and Atsbeha to Dil Na'od). A manuscript held in the British Museum appears to show the closest similarity in names and chronological order of kings compared to Tafari's list.

Many other Ethiopian king lists do not acknowledge a dynastic break between Kaleb and earlier kings. It is possible that this list marks a break here only because it considers Kaleb to be the first emperor of Ethiopia.

Despite this section's heading, three further rulers are named after Gedajan, with Dil Na'od being the actual last king of this line of Axumite kings. The choice of title for this section may be due the interruption of the Axumite line by queen Gudit, although most Ethiopian traditions state that she usurped the throne after Dil Na'od, and thus her reign is often dated later compared to this king list.

Sovereigns issued from Zagwe (333 years)

The following monarchs are historically verified, though exact dates remain unclear among historians. Some historians, such as Carlo Conti Rossini, believe that this dynasty did not come to power until the 12th century, disagreeing with the much earlier dates suggested by Tafari's list. Some Ethiopian king lists omit the Zagwe dynasty altogether. Many king lists state that after the reign of Dil Na'od the kingdom was ruled by "another people who were not of the tribe of Israel" (i.e. not descended from king Solomon).

Multiple versions of the Ethiopian tradition around the Zagwe dynasty exist, most commonly stating that the dynasty was in power for 133 or 333 years. Tafari follows the longer tradition for his king list. Carlo Conti Rossini suggested that the Zagwe dynasty was actually founded shortly before 1150. E. A. Wallis Budge noted another version of the Zagwe tradition states that 11 kings ruled for 354 years, meaning that each king reigned for an average of 32 years, which Budge felt was unrealistic. James Bruce theorized that five kings of this dynasty were Jewish and descendants of Gudit, while the other six kings were Christians and originated from Lasta. Bruce specifically named Tatadim, Jan Seyum, Germa Seyum, Harbai and Mairari as the "Pagan" or Jewish kings, while Mara Takla Haymanot, Kedus Harbe, Yetbarak, Lalibela, Yemrehana Krestos and Na'akueto La'ab (in these chronological orders) were Christians.

E. A. Wallis Budge noted another tradition that claimed that Na'akueto La'ab abdicated the throne in favour of Yekuno Amlak. If this was the case, then according to Budge the dynasty may have continued to claim the title of Negus until c. 1330, with their descendants governing Lasta for centuries after this.

Three inscriptions discovered in Axum mention the names of two kings, Dabra Ferem and his son Hasani Dan'el, who were Christian but are not recorded on Ethiopian king lists. The first inscription tells how Hasani Dan'el attacked rebel tribes in Kassala and claims that he conquered thirty peoples. The second inscription tells how the people of Welkait rebelled and laid waste to Axum, and in response he carried off large numbers of cattle and other animals from them. Dan'el then went to the country of the Maya and took 10,000 sheep and 3,000 cattle. The third inscription tells of how Dan'el went to Axum after his campaigns to be acknowledged as king and imprisoned the old king. It is difficult to date the reigns of these kings, but it likely occurred in the early 10th century when the power of the Solomonic line was in decline. Enno Littmann theorized that these kings were forerunners of the Zagwe dynasty and Budge believed that they may have even founded the Zagwe line.

The following list includes seven consecutive kings ruling for 40 years each. This is also reported in other king lists, although there is no confirmed proof that these seven kings ruled for these exact number of years. The suspiciously round numbers given for their reign lengths may suggest certain gaps in Ethiopia's history that were filled in by extending the reigns of the Zagwe kings. The existence of multiple traditions for this dynasty, ranging from 133 to 333 years in power, further suggest great uncertainty over this period in Ethiopian history. See Alternate Zagwe dynasty lists section for more information on the alternate lines of succession for this dynasty.

Claimants during the Zagwe period
"Chronological table of the 8 generations of an Israelitish dynasty, who were not raised to the throne, during the period of the reign of the posterity of the Zagwe."

Tafari provides no background information on this list of kings, however E. A. Wallis Budge stated that these kings reigned at Shewa and were descendants of Dil Na'od. Henry Salt likewise stated that the Axumite royal family fled to Shewa after Axum was destroyed by Gudit and reigned there for 330 years until the accession of Yekuno Amlak. The names and order of kings on Tafari's list matches that found in René Basset's 1882 book Études sur l'histoire d'Éthiopie.

A manuscript from Dabra Libanos included an alternate list which numbered a total of 44 kings and a woman named Masoba Wark. In some traditions, Masoba Wark is claimed to be a daughter of Dil Na'od who married Mara Takla Haymanot. Yekuno Amlak would claim his descent from king Solomon through this line of kings (see Emperors of Ethiopia Family Tree).

The description of this dynasty as an "Israelitish" dynasty is likely a reference to the claim of the Ethiopian monarchy being descended from Solomon of Israel.

Solomonic dynasty before the Ethiopian-Adal war (247 years)

"Chronological table of the sovereigns from Yekuno Amlak, Emperor, and of his posterity, all issued from the ancient dynasties which were raised to the throne".Note: The following emperors are historically verified. However, some of the reign dates listed below are not used by Ethiopian historians and are inaccurate. For the correct reign dates, see List of emperors of Ethiopia.

The Solomonic dynasty is historically verified, but the dates included on Tafari's king list do not always match with the generally accepted dates used by historians, even when taking into account the 7 or 8-year gap between the Ethiopian calendar and the Gregorian calendar.

Historian Manfred Kropp was skeptical of the way this dynasty is often referred to as the "Solomonic" or "Solomonid" dynasty, which he believes was a creation of European Renaissance scholars. He noted that Ethiopian chronicles refer to the throne of the monarchy as the "Throne of David", not Solomon. Tafari's king list certainly makes no direct reference to this dynasty being called the "Solomonic" line, only that they were descended from the earlier ancient dynasties.

Solomonic dynasty during the Ethiopian-Adal war (55 years)Note: The following emperors are historically verified. However, some of the reign dates listed below are not used by Ethiopian historians and are inaccurate. For the correct reign dates, see List of emperors of Ethiopia.Text accompanying this section:"Elevation to the throne of Atse (Emperor) Lebna Dengel, and the invasion of Ethiopia by Gran"
"Fifteen years after Atse (Emperor) Lebna Dengel came to the throne Gran devastated Ethiopia for fifteen years."

The following three kings are usually considered part of the Solomonic dynasty, but are separated by Tafari into a different group, likely because the conquest of three-quarters of Ethiopia by Ahmad ibn Ibrahim al-Ghazi took place during this time.

The House of Gondar (224 years)Note: The following emperors are historically verified. However, some of the reign dates listed below are not used by Ethiopian historians and are inaccurate. For the correct reign dates, see List of emperors of Ethiopia.

The Gordarian Line of the Solomonic dynasty is usually defined as beginning with the reign of Susenyos, however Tafari includes the 3 prior kings to Susenyos as part of this line as well. This is likely because Sarsa Dengel moved the centre of the Ethiopian empire away from Shewa to the Begemder province, where Gondar is located.

Tafari omitted Susenyos II, who reigned briefly in 1770, from this king list. Susenyos II was said to be an illegitimate son of Iyasu II, but his claims are dubious and thus he may not have been considered a legitimate part of the Solomonic/Menelik line.

Subsequent monarchs

Tafari's king list concludes with the end of the first reign of Takla Giyorgis, after which the Emperors of Ethiopia had significantly diminished power compared to before. By the time Tekle Giyorgis I begun his reign, Ethiopia had already entered the "Zemene Mesafint" or Era of the Princes, during which the emperor was merely a figurehead.

Charles F. Rey provided a list of monarchs that reigned after Takla Giyorgis I, with dates following the Gregorian calendar. Rey noted that from around 1730 to 1855, the kings of Ethiopia had no real power. The power was held by influential Rases, such Ras Mikael Suhul of Tigre (1730–1780), Ras Guksa of Amhara (1790–1819), his son Ras Maryre and grandson Ras Ali.

Rey's list includes the majority of emperors from Iyasu III to the then-incumbent empress Zewditu and prince-regent and heir Tafari Makanannon (the future Haile Selassie). Rey's list however ignored the reigns of Salomon III and Tekle Giyorgis II, as well as the repeated reigns of Tekle Giyorgis I, Demetros and Yohannes III after their first reign. Rey also names Tekle Haymanot of Gondar as emperor of Ethiopia from 1788 to 1789, although he usually not accepted as a legitimate monarch of Ethiopia.

Other King Lists
Apart from Tafari's list, various other Ethiopian king lists are known to exist with variations between them.

Alternate list of pre-Flood and post-Flood kings

E. A. Wallis Budge noted that a list of early kings of Ethiopia was known to exist, although it relied on Biblical chronology, particularly from the Book of Genesis. The following list was included in Budge's book A History of Ethiopia (Volume I) and was quoted from two manuscripts; One held in the British Museum and another held in the Bibliothèque nationale de France, which was published in René Basset's 1882 book Études sur l'histoire d'Éthiopie. The names of these kings appear in the Kebra Nagast.

The last king, 'Ebna Hakim, does not appear in the Bible and is meant to be Menelik I, the son of Solomon and the Queen of Sheba. The name Ebna Hakim translates to "Son of the Wise Man" (i.e. Solomon) in Arabic.

The Kebra Nagast lists an additional king named 'Orni between Hezron and Aram, who was the son of Hezron and father of Aram. Budge believes this king to be Oren, son of Jerahmeel. It is unknown why this additional king appears in the Kebra Nagast, but his inclusion could explain why Tafari's list begins with a ruler named "Ori (or Aram)" as both names appear next to each other in the Kebra Nagast.

Akhbar al-Zaman
The monarchs of Tafari's "Tribe of Ori or Aram" are largely unseen on other Ethiopian king lists. These monarchs almost certainly originated from Coptic and Arab texts, as evidenced by a list of Antediluvian kings of Egypt seen by French historian Louis J. Morié that very closely matches the names on Tafari's list.

This king list was possibly based on an earlier list found in the medieval Arab text Akhbar al-Zaman (whose title translates to "The History of Time"), which was written between 940 A.D. and 1140 A.D. Although it is likely based on earlier works such as those of Abu Ma'shar (dated to c. 840-860 A.D.). The authorship is unknown, but Al-Masudi is possible candidate. The text contains a collection of lore about Egypt and the wider world in the age before the Great Flood and after it. The Akhbar al-Zaman kings frequently reign for impossibly long periods of time, with only two kings showing a similarity in length of reigns with those on Tafari's list. Nineteen kings appear on both lists, with two ruling women also being mentioned.

Alternate Hamitic dynasty

E. A. Wallis Budge noted that while the list of pre-Flood kings listed above omitted any mention of Ham, an alternate Ethiopian tradition presents a genealogy of Ethiopians descending from Ham, son of Noah. Tafari's list also includes a dynasty of kings descending from Ham, however the names and order of kings is noticeably different and some kings on this alternate list are part of different dynasties entirely on Tafari's list. Budge theorized that these kings may have been pagan worshipers of the serpent Arwe.

According to this tradition, Aksum was founded within a century after the Great Flood.

Enno Littmann recorded a tradition from an Ethiopian priest named Gabra Wahad, who stated the following:
"Ham begot Kush, Kush begot Aethiopis, after whom the country is called Aethiopia to this day. Aethiopis was buried in Aksum, and his grave is known there to this day. It was said that a fire used to burn in it, and that if any donkey's excrement or any bit of stuff fell into it it was consumed. Aethiopis begot 'Aksumawi, 'Aksumawi begot Malayka 'Aksum, and begot also Sum, Nafas, Bagi'o, Kuduki, 'Akhoro, Fasheba. These six sons of 'Aksumawi became the fathers of Aksum. When they wished to divide their land, there came a man called May Bih, and as people say divided their land as an agent. Each of the six gave him two acres of land and he settled down with them."

Arwe dynasty
The mythical serpent Arwe is sometimes considered to be part of his own dynasty. However, he is not named directly on the 1922 king list, except that he was killed by Angabo I. Traditions quoted by Henry Salt and E. A. Wallis Budge differ on whether Arwe himself reigned for 400 years or whether this figure refers to the dynasty as a whole.

Angabo dynasty
Some Ethiopian traditions consider Angabo to be the founder of a new dynasty after killing Arwe. The relations between these kings are not recorded, but presumably each king was the son of the previous one.

E. A. Wallis Budge called this dynasty a "Native African dynasty" to differentiate it from the "Kush dynasty".

All rulers of this dynasty were included on the 1922 king list as part of the "Agdazyan" or "Ag'azyan" dynasty. In most cases their reign lengths were shortened to be more realistic.

Alternate King lists from Menelik I to Bazen

European travelers James Bruce and Henry Salt published king lists in their books Travels to Discover the Source of the Nile (1790) and A Voyage to Abyssinia (1814). Bruce acquired an Ethiopian manuscript which later became part of the Bodleian Library in Oxford. Bruce had gathered information for his king list from local scribes, though did not believe they were trustworthy or that his king list was complete. Italian orientalist Carlo Conti Rossini edited a book titled History of the Kings of Dabra Yahanes, published in 1903, which contained another king list.

E. A. Wallis Budge compared the content of Bruce's, Salt's and Rossini's lists with that of two manuscripts held in the British Museum. Tafari's list is far longer and contains many additional kings. The tables below list kings whose names match those found on the other lists and the numbered position they have on Tafari's list.

Budge theorised that the existence of multiple king lists suggest that these represent rival claimants to the throne. Budge regarded a line of kings as represented by the British Museum manuscript Oriental No. 831, fol. 36a to be the most authoritative.

Bruce's, Rossini's and Tafari's lists are all in agreement that Christ was born in the eighth year of Bazen's reign, a statement that is also clear on one of the British Museum manuscripts. If one was to calculate backwards from the Bazen's reign, then Salt's list would date Menelik I to 128–99 B.C., over 9 centuries after the traditional 10th century B.C. dating of Menelik's reign. If the same was done for Bruce's list, then Menelik's reign would be pushed back nearly a century earlier but would still fall far short of the 10th century B.C. dating.

Salt noted the existence of a "corrupt" king list. This list is included in the table below but was not quoted by E. A. Wallis Budge. The only obvious inaccuracy of the "corrupt" king list is the combining of kings Tomai and Zagdur into one king. Otherwise, the list shows noticeable similarities with the one quoted by Rossini and one of the British Museum manuscripts.

Alternate King lists from Bazen to Abreha and Atsbeha (up to c. 333 AD)

Henry Salt and the British Museum manuscript Oriental No. 821, fol. 28b have a noticeably different line of kings running up to Abreha and Atsbeha. Both sources follow a similar order with the major difference being that Salt's list places Abreha and Atsbeha's reign much earlier in the chronological order.

Salt noted that the king list he quoted dated exactly 330 years between the birth of Christ and the thirteenth year of Abreha's reign, when Christianity was introduced. This is the same period of time which is quoted in other Ethiopian chronicles.

Henry Salt theorised that the change of prefix from "Za" to "El" after the reign of Za Elasguaga reflected a change of dynasty. He believed that this theory could be confirmed by the short reigns of Za Baesi Tsawesa, Za Wakena and Za Hadus, who all reigned for a combined total of 1 year, 4 months and 2 days after the first "El" king, El Herka. He believed that the "Za" kings were the "shepherd kings" or "original Ethiopians" before being replaced by a new "race" of kings. Salt suggested that this change may have been caused by colony of Syrians who were placed by Alexander the Great near the mouth of the Red Sea according to an account written by Philostorgius.

Alternate King lists from Abreha and Atsbeha to Dil Na'od (c. 333–960)

Tafari considers all kings from Kaleb onwards to be part of a different dynasty. However, other Ethiopian traditions do not state that there was any dynastic break here.

E. A. Wallis Budge mentioned a chronicle with a specific list of kings, who he believed were "kinglets" who ruled parts of Ethiopia separate from other lines of kings between 360 and 480. However, he does not mention the source of this list of kings.

Henry Salt noted that one chronicle explicitly stated that 330 years had passed between the birth of Christ and the thirteenth year of Abreha's reign, however the same chronicle makes a "very striking error" by placing Abreha after El Ahiawya and thus suggesting that his thirteenth reign took place 465 years after the birth of Christ. As a result, Salt's personal king list alters the order slightly by placing Abreha and Atsbeha much further up the king list. Salt believed that the five rulers of his list from El Ahiawya to Seladoba "should [probably] be also removed" altogether, which may explain why Budge did not name them when quoting Salt's king list. Salt additionally believed that there should only be one king named Ameda, though his list names two kings of this name.

The four kings Asfah, Arfad, Amosi and Seladoba reigned for a total of 32 years according to Salt's list, though he personally felt that it was more likely they reigned for a total of 70 years. Salt noted that the kings from Ameda to Dil Na'od did not have reign lengths assigned to them in the chronicles but may have reigned for a total of 354 years.

Páez and Almeida
Pedro Páez and Manuel de Almeida saw two different manuscripts that likely dated to before 1621. Both Páez and Almeida stated that they received the information from books lent to them by the Ethiopian emperor Susenyos I. Notably, both lists include kings that are otherwise not mentioned on Tafari's list.

The following two lists include names of kings from before the Zagwe dynasty. Numbers in bracket state which position the kings appear on Tafari's list, while those with an asterisk do not appear at all on Tafari's list.

Paris Chronicle
This king list was written in the eighteenth century. Names given below are those that ruled before the Zagwe dynasty. The numbers placed next to the name state which position the king occupies on Tafari's list. The list closely matches the order of kings in Tafari's list from 247 to 256 with the exception that it does not mention Queen Gudit.

Debre Libanos Manuscript
A manuscript from the Debre Libanos monastery of unknown age. The following kings are those who reigned before the Zagwe dynasty.

Alternate Zagwe dynasty lists

Ethiopian traditions are in agreement that the Zagwe dynasty directly preceded the Solomonic dynasty, but differ regarding when this dynasty first came to power, how long it remained in power and even the number of kings who ruled. Tafari's king list acknowledges eleven kings who ruled for 333 years in total, beginning in the early 10th century. However, the fact that this list includes seven consecutive kings ruling for exactly 40 years each casts doubt on its historical accuracy. By comparison, a book seen by Pedro Páez and Manuel de Almeida claimed only 5 kings ruled for 143 years, while the Paris Chronicle states eleven kings reigned for 354 years. A manuscript held in Paris (no. 64) claimed 5 kings whose rule began in either 1145 or 1147 and ended in either 1268 or 1270.

A text from Dabra Libanos, quoted by Carlo Conti Rossini, claimed the following list of Zagwe kings:Takla Haymanot reigned 40 years.Jan Seyum reigned 40 years.Germa Seyum reigned 40 years.Gempawedamo reigned 40 years.Yemreha reigned 40 years.Gabra Maryam reigned 40 years.Lalibala reigned 40 years.Na'akueto La'ab reigned 40 years.Yetbarak reigned 9 years.
This list omits Tatadim, Kedus Harbe, Mairari and Harbai, who appear on other king lists. The kings named Gempawedamo and Gabra Maryam do not appear on Tafari's list. The text that contains this list claims that Gempawedamo was the third son of Mara Takla Haymanot.

Rossini also quoted another list that was published in 1902:PantawPantadem (Tatadim)Djan SeyumDjan Germe (Germa Seyum)
'Arbe (Kedus Harbe)LalibalaNa'akueto La'abYemrehana KrestosYetbarakThis list moves Yemrehana Krestos further down the order of kings compared to most other Zagwe king lists. It is unclear who "Pantaw" is and whether he can be identified with the traditional Zagwe founder, Mara Takla Haymanot, or not. This list also omits the ephemeral emperors Mairari and Harbai.

A manuscript held in the British Museum (Or. 821, fol. 28b), holds a different list of kings which closer match Tafari's list, though with a noticeably short reign for Mara Takla Haymanot.Takla Haymanot – 3 yearsTatadem – 40 yearsJan Sheyum – 40 yearsGerma Sheyum – 40 yearsYemrehna Krestos – 40 yearsKedus Harbe – 40 yearsLalibala – 40 yearsNa'akueto La'ab – 48 yearsYetbarak – 40 yearsMayrari – 15 yearsHarbay' – 8 years

In his book, Regents of Nations, Peter Truhart included a longer list of Zagwe kings, which featured many kings that do not appear on the most commonly known lists.

Legendary monarchs from non-Ethiopian sources
Due to Ethiopia's long history and unique culture, various legends on the country and its monarchs have developed in non-indigenous sources. Such stories tell us how Ethiopia was perceived by the outside world.

Prester John

During the 12th to 17th centuries, a popular story in Europe told of a Christian king who ruled a kingdom in the Orient which was surrounded by numerous Pagan and Muslim kingdoms. Prester John's kingdom was said to be located in various regions, such as India or Central Asia, but in time came to be associated with Ethiopia, due to its relative isolation as a Christian kingdom. Ethiopia appears to have become generally accepted as the location of Prester John's kingdom by 1250. Increasing interactions between Europe and Ethiopia during the 15th and 16th centuries solidified Ethiopia as the preferred home of Prester John. By 1520, Europeans knew the Ethiopian emperor Lebna Dengel by the name "Prester John". In his book A New History of Ethiopia'', Hiob Ludolf stated that the name "Prester John" was first given to the king of Abyssinia by the Portuguese.

The Ethiopians themselves however never acknowledged a king named "Prester John" and such a king does not appear on their king lists. Ambassadors of Emperor Zara Yaqob who attended the Council of Florence in 1441 were left confused when the council referred to them as representatives of "Prester John". The ambassadors explained that no such king by this name appeared on Zara Yaqob's regnal list, however the name "Prester John" kept being used by the Europeans. Emperor Iyasu II may have been the first to hear of the "Prester John" legend when he was asked about it by a Czech Franciscan named Remedius Prutky in 1751, to which the emperor responded by stating that no kings of Ethiopia had ever called themselves by the name of "Prester John".

Alchitrof

16th century Italian historian and biographer Paolo Giovio (1483–1552) assembled a series of 484 portraits, known as the Giovio Series. These portraits included, but where not limited to, rulers, statesmen and literary figures. Much of the original collection is now lost, but it is preserved in a series of at least 280 copies made by the Italian painter Cristofano dell'Altissimo (c. 1525–1605).

From the surviving copies by Cristifano, two portraits are of Ethiopian monarchs. The first of these was of Emperor Lebna Dengel (r. 1508–1540) while the other was of a king named "Alchitrof", who is not named in any Ethiopian king lists. The portrait of Alchitrof includes a feathered headdress and three rings on his lower lip, features which do not match with what is known about Ethiopian custom and culture during the period when the portrait was painted. It is possible that "Alchitrof" is not meant to be real person but rather "a fantastic approach" from a European perspective.

Kate Lowe, a professor of Renaissance history, suggested that the name "Alchitrof" may be a corruption of the name of Lebna Dengel's eldest son al-Fiqtur. Lowe also suggested that the there may be a "mismatch" between the image and its inscription, as the clothing and jewellery are often used in reference to South America rather than sub-Saharan Africa in Renaissance art. Additionally, Lowe argued that "Achitrof" may be an "imagined Brazilian, Carib or Amerindian chief or ruler" with his facial features being inspired by "more realistic physiognomic features taken from black Africans in Europe".

Alternatively, Alchitrof may not have been a king in the modern-day territory of Ethiopia, but rather that the "Aethiopia" mentioned refers to a more generalized region covering much of Sub-Saharan Africa and thus Alchitrof, if he existed, may have been king of a totally different geographical region to that of Lebna Dengel. The modern-day region of Ethiopia was frequently called "Abyssinia" by the Europeans at the time the painting was made and the painting of Lebna Dengel specifically calls him the "Great King of the Abyssinians" instead of "Aethiopia" as used in the portrait of Alchitrof, suggesting that the original artist (or copier) deliberately chose to differentiate their regions of rule.

See also
Ethiopian historiography
List of emperors of Ethiopia - Rulers of Ethiopia from Mara Takla Haymanot to Amha Selassie
List of royal consorts of Ethiopia
Index of Ethiopia-related articles

Notes

Sources

Further reading
 
 
 
 
 
 
 
 
 
 
 
 

Emperors of Ethiopia
Ethiopian characters in Greek mythology
Ethiopian literature
Ethiopian monarchy
Legendary monarchs
History of Ethiopia
Ethiopia
King lists
Legendary Ethiopian people
Ethiopia
Ethiopian
Ethiopia
Rulers of Ethiopia